= Bern =

Federal city of Switzerland

Bern Berne
- Municipality
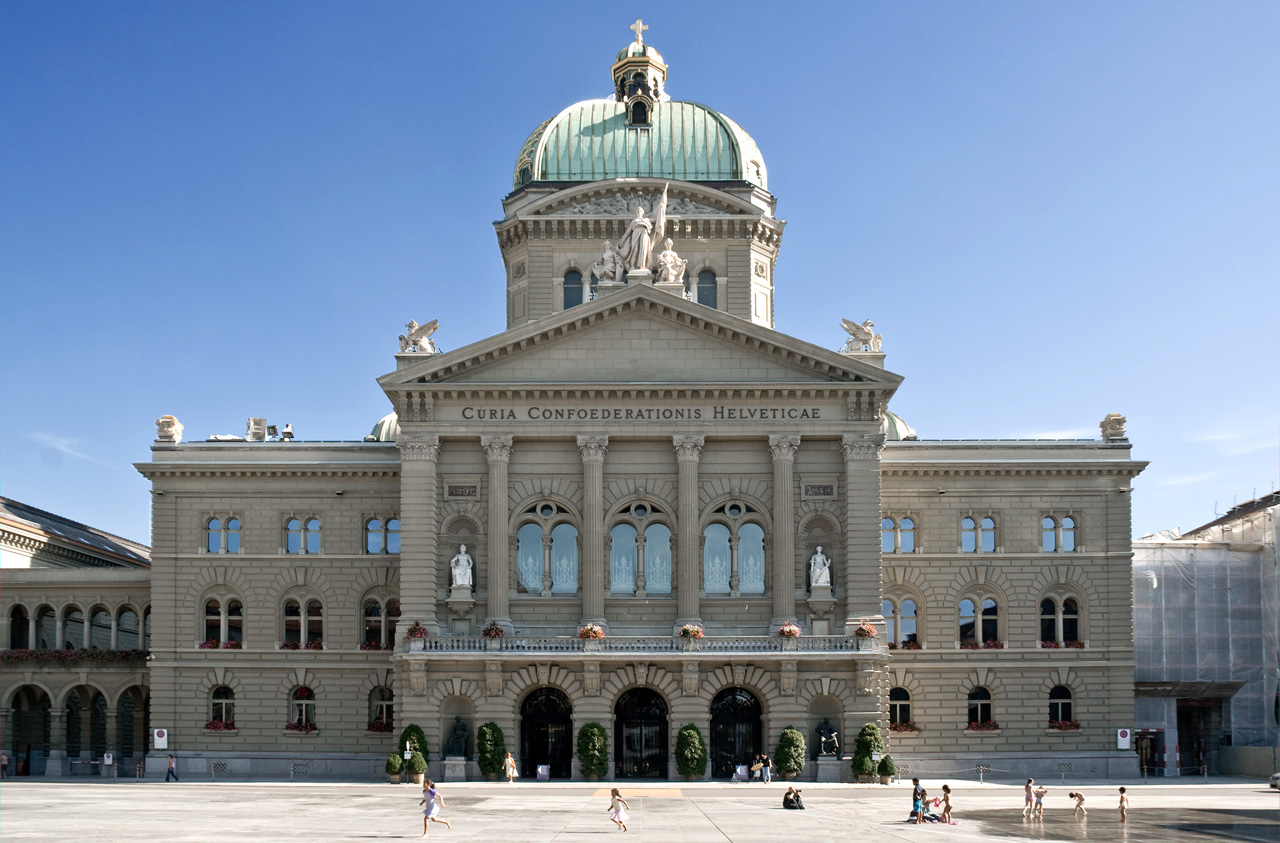
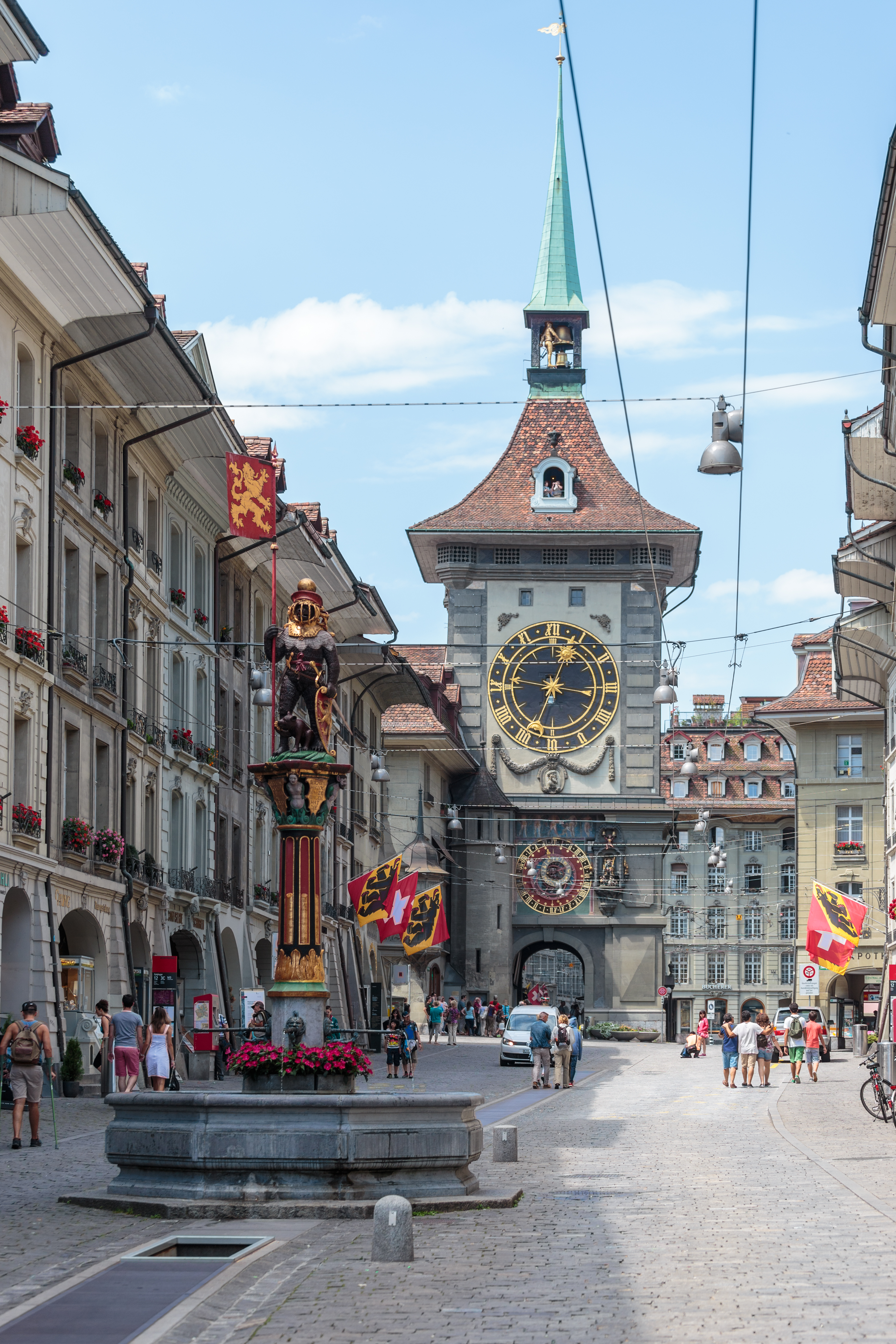
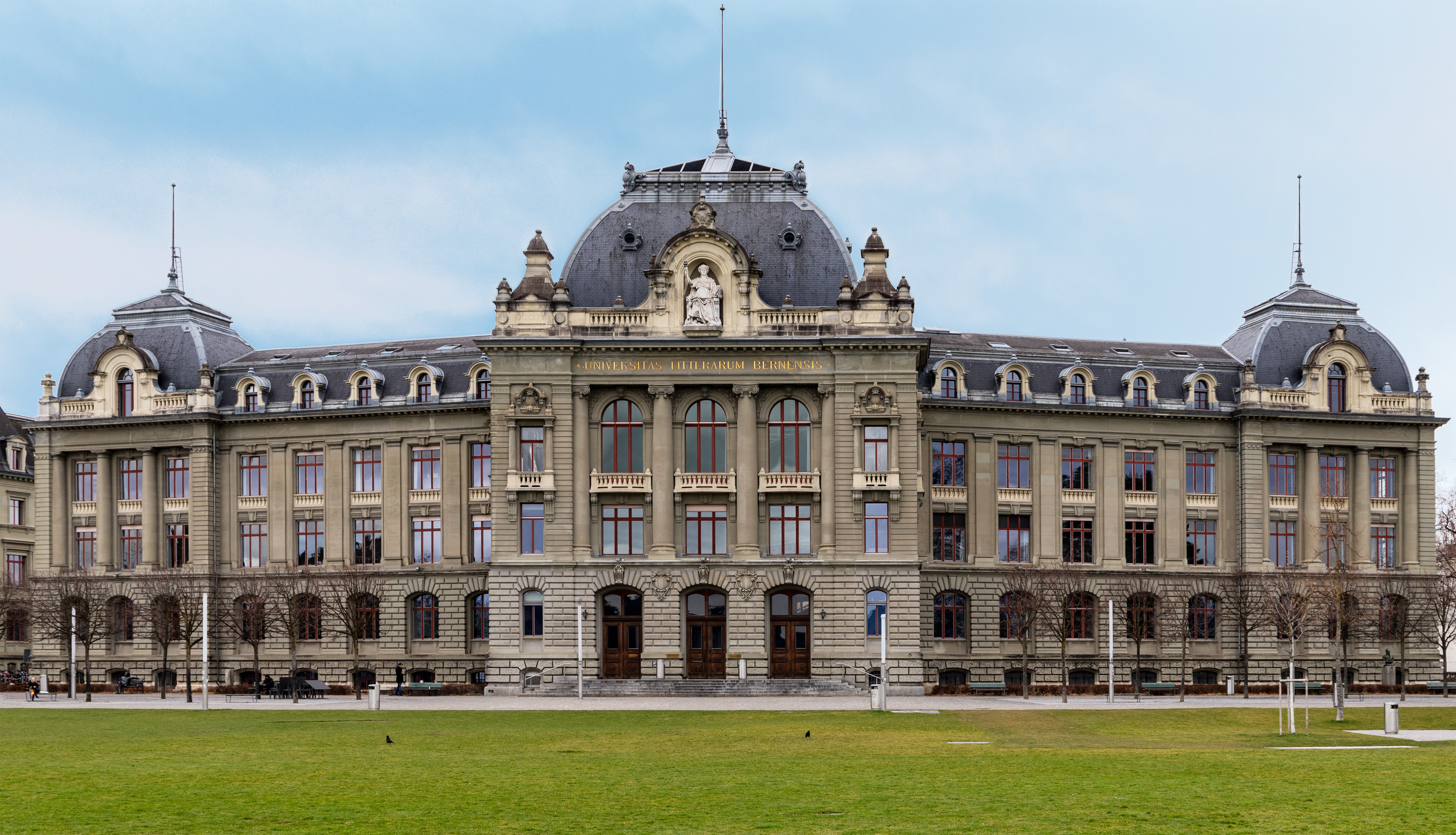
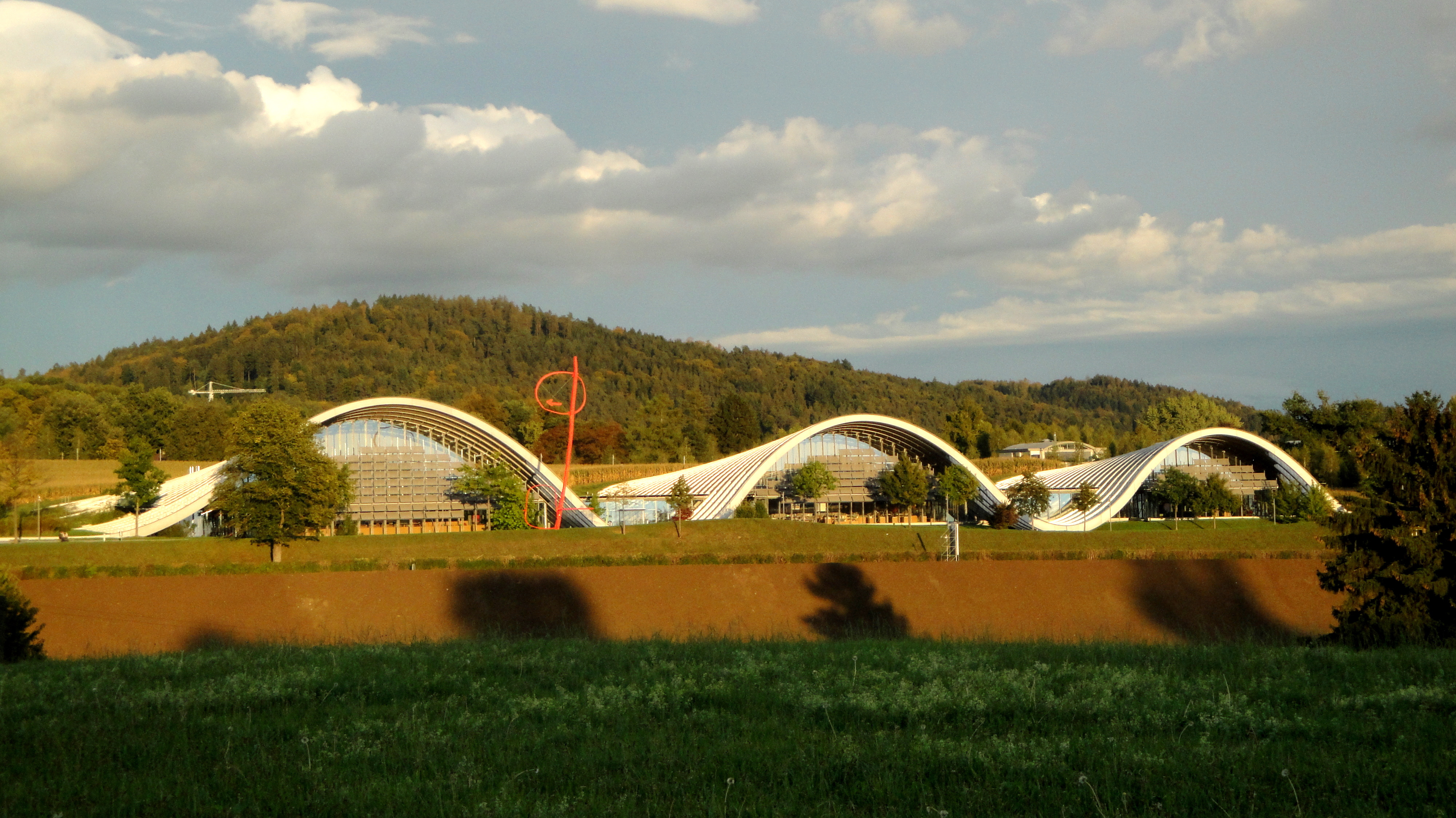
- Federal Palace of Switzerland Zytglogge University of Bern Zentrum Paul Klee Old City panorama Aerial view of the Old City and the Aare

- Flag Coat of arms
- Location of Bern
- Location within Switzerland Location within Canton of Bern
- Coordinates: 46°56′53″N 7°26′51″E
- Country: Switzerland
- Canton: Bern
- District: Bern-Mittelland administrative district

Government
  - Executive: Gemeinderat with 5 members
  - Mayor: Stadtpräsidentin (list); Marieke Kruit SPS/PSS (as of January 2025)
  - Parliament: Stadtrat with 80 members

Area
  - Total: 51.6 km^{2} (19.9 sq mi)
- Elevation (Bahnhofplatz): 540 m (1,770 ft)
- Highest elevation (Könizberg): 674 m (2,211 ft)
- Lowest elevation (Aare near to Eymatt): 481 m (1,578 ft)

Population (December 2020)
  - Total: 134,794
  - Density: 2,610/km^{2} (6,770/sq mi)
- Demonym(s): English: Bernese; German: Berner(in); French: Bernois(e); Italian: Bernese
- Time zone: UTC+01:00 (CET)
  - Summer (DST): UTC+02:00 (CEST)
- Postal code: 3000–3030
- SFOS number: 351
- ISO 3166 code: CH-BE
- Localities: Altenberg, Aaregg, Bümpliz, Bethlehem, Beundenfeld, Bottigen, Breitenrain, Breitfeld, Brunnadern, Dählhölzli, Engeried, Gäbelbach, Grosser Bremgartenwald, Gryphenhübeli, Felsenau, Holligen, Innere Stadt, Kirchenfeld, Könizbergwald, Länggasse, Lorraine, Muesmatt, Murifeld, Neufeld, Sandrain, Schosshalde, Spitalacker, Stöckacker, Tiefenau, Wankdorf, Weissenbühl, Weissenstein
- Surrounded by: Bremgarten bei Bern, Frauenkappelen, Ittigen, Kirchlindach, Köniz, Mühleberg, Muri bei Bern, Neuenegg, Ostermundigen, Wohlen bei Bern, Zollikofen
- Website: bern.ch

UNESCO World Heritage Site
- Official name: Old City of Berne
- Criteria: Cultural: iii
- Reference: 267
- Inscription: 1983 (7th Session)
- Area: 91.86 ha (227.0 acres)

Bern (Swiss Standard German: [bɛrn]), or Berne (French: [bɛʁn]), (Note: Alemannic German: Bärn [b̥æːrn]; Arpitan: Bèrna [ˈbɛʁna]; Italian: Berna [ˈbɛrna]; Romansh: Berna [ˈbɛrnɐ].) is the de facto capital of Switzerland, (Note: Switzerland has no de jure capital.) referred to as the "federal city". (Note: German: Bundesstadt; French: ville fédérale; Italian: città federale; Romansh: citad federala. According to the Swiss constitution, the Swiss Confederation intentionally has no capital, but Bern has governmental institutions such as the Federal Assembly and Federal Council. However, the Federal Supreme Court is in Lausanne, the Federal Criminal Court is in Bellinzona and the Federal Administrative Court and the Federal Patent Court are in St. Gallen, exemplifying the federal nature of the Confederation.) With a population of about 146,000 (as of 2024), Bern is the fifth-most populous city in Switzerland, behind Zurich, Geneva, Basel and Lausanne. The Bern agglomeration, which includes 36 municipalities, had a population of 406,900 in 2014. The metropolitan area had a population of 660,000 in 2000.

Bern is also the capital of the canton of Bern, the second-most populous of Switzerland's cantons. In 1983, the historic old town (in German: Altstadt) in the centre of Bern became a UNESCO World Heritage Site. It is surrounded by the Aare, a major river of the Swiss Plateau.

Although fortified settlements were established since antiquity, the medieval city proper was founded by the Zähringer ruling family, probably in 1191 by Berthold V, Duke of Zähringen. Bern was made a free imperial city in 1218 and, in 1353, it joined the Swiss Confederacy, becoming one of its eight early cantons. Since then, Bern became a large city-state and a prominent actor of Swiss history by pursuing a policy of sovereign territorial expansion. Since the 15th century, the city was progressively rebuilt and acquired its current characteristics. Bern was made the federal city in 1848. From about 5,000 inhabitants in the 15th century, the city passed the 100,000 mark in the 1920s.

== Etymology ==
The etymology of the name "Bern" is uncertain. According to the local legend, based on folk etymology, Berthold V, Duke of Zähringen, the founder of the city of Bern, vowed to name the city after the first animal he met on the hunt, and this turned out to be a bear (Middle High German bër). It has long been considered likely that the city was named after the Italian city of Verona, which at the time was known as Bern in Middle High German. The city was sometimes referred to as Bern im Üechtland to distinguish it from Verona. As a result of the finding of the Bern zinc tablet in the 1980s, it is now more common to assume that the city was named after a pre-existing toponym of Celtic origin, possibly *berna "cleft". The bear was the heraldic animal of the seal and coat of arms of Bern from at least the 1220s. The earliest reference to the keeping of live bears in the Bärengraben dates to the 1440s.

== History ==
=== Early history ===
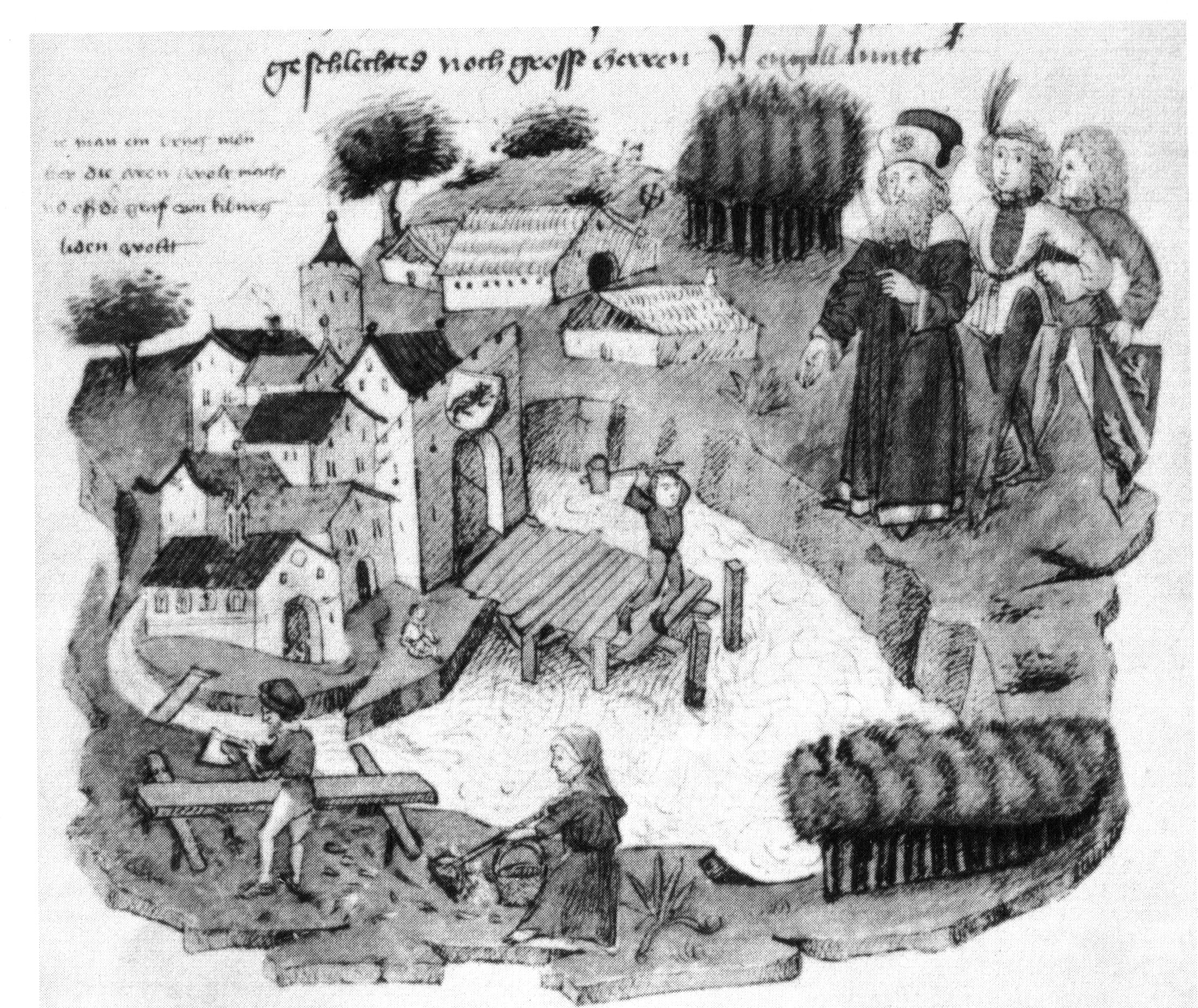
Construction of the Untertorbrücke (Lower Gate Bridge) in Bern, Tschachtlanchronik, late 15th century

No archaeological evidence that indicates a settlement on the site of today's city centre prior to the 12th century has been found so far. In antiquity, a Celtic oppidum stood on the Engehalbinsel (peninsula) north of Bern, fortified since the second century BC (late La Tène period), thought to be one of the 12 oppida of the Helvetii mentioned by Caesar. During the Roman era, a Gallo-Roman vicus was on the same site. The Bern zinc tablet has the name Brenodor ("dwelling of Breno"). In the Early Middle Ages, a settlement in Bümpliz, now a city district of Bern, was some 4 km (2 mi) from the medieval city.

The medieval city is a foundation of the Zähringer ruling family, which rose to power in Upper Burgundy in the 12th century. According to 14th-century historiography (Cronica de Berno, 1309), Bern was founded in 1191 by Berthold V, Duke of Zähringen.

In 1218, after Berthold died without an heir, Bern was made a free imperial city by the Goldene Handfeste of Holy Roman Emperor Frederick II.

=== Old Swiss Confederacy ===
In 1353, Bern joined the Swiss Confederacy, becoming the eighth canton of the formative period of 1353 to 1481.

Bern invaded and conquered Aargau in 1415 and Vaud in 1536, as well as other smaller territories, thereby becoming the largest city-state north of the Alps. By the 18th century, it comprised most of what is today the canton of Bern and the canton of Vaud.

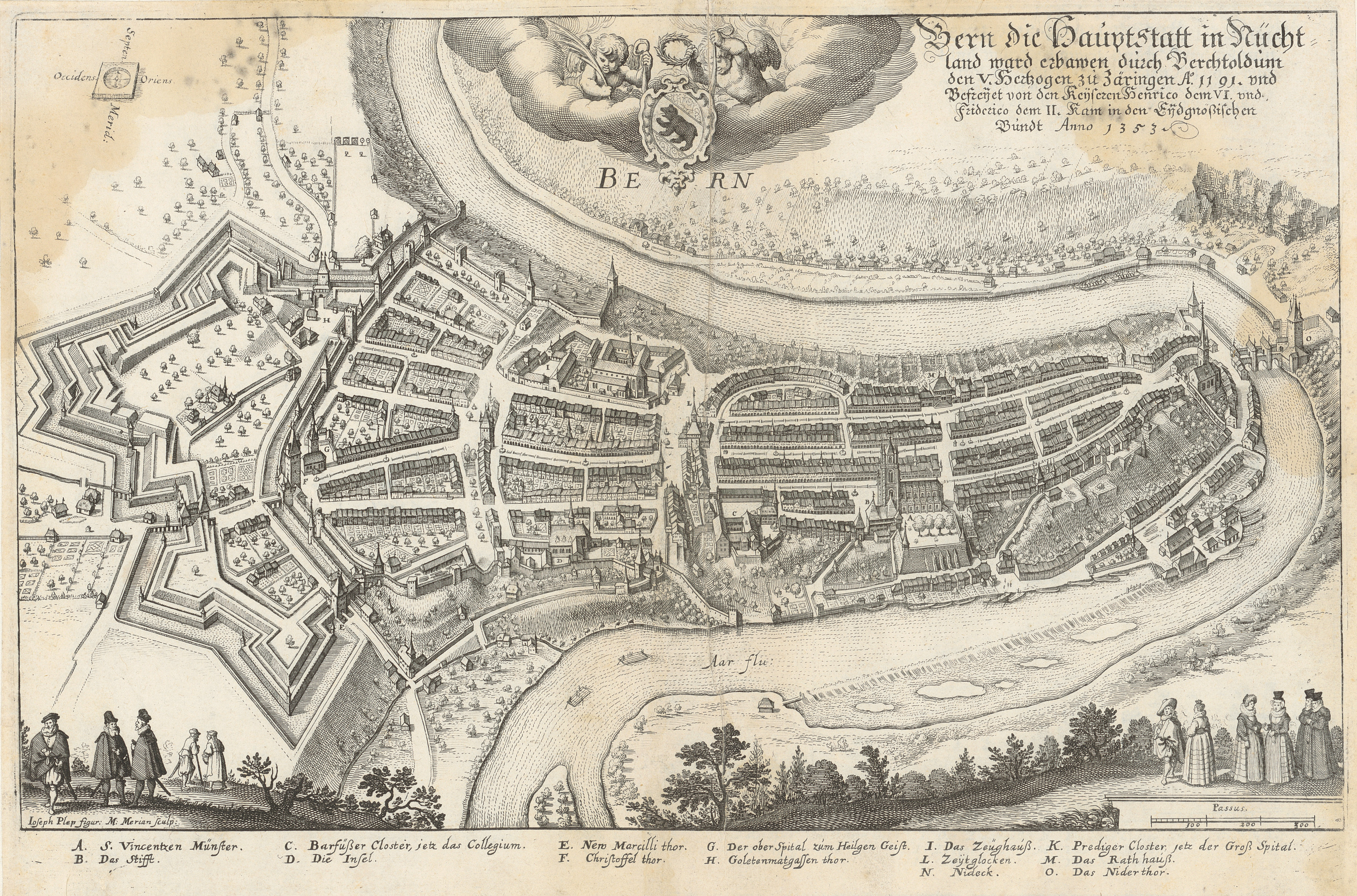
Bern, c. 1640. Etching by Matthäus Merian

The city grew out towards the west of the boundaries of the peninsula formed by the river Aare. The Zytglogge tower marked the western boundary of the city from 1191 until 1256, when the Käfigturm took over this role until 1345. It was succeeded by the Christoffelturm (formerly located closer to the site of the modern-day railway station) until 1622. During the Thirty Years' War, two new fortifications – the so-called big and small Schanze (entrenchments) – were built to protect the whole area of the peninsula.

After a major blaze in 1405, the city's original wooden buildings were gradually replaced by half-timbered houses, and subsequently the sandstone buildings which came to be characteristic for the Old Town. Despite waves of pestilence that hit Europe in the 14th century, the city continued to grow, mainly due to immigration from the surrounding countryside.

During the 18th century, the city of Bern was at one point the largest shareholder in the South Sea Company, a British joint-stock company which was involved in the Atlantic slave trade. From 1689 to 3 March 1798 in the town was printed, in French, the biweekly newspaper Gazette de Berne, which reflected the opinions of Bern, usually hostile to the politics of Pre-revolutionary France.

=== Modern history ===
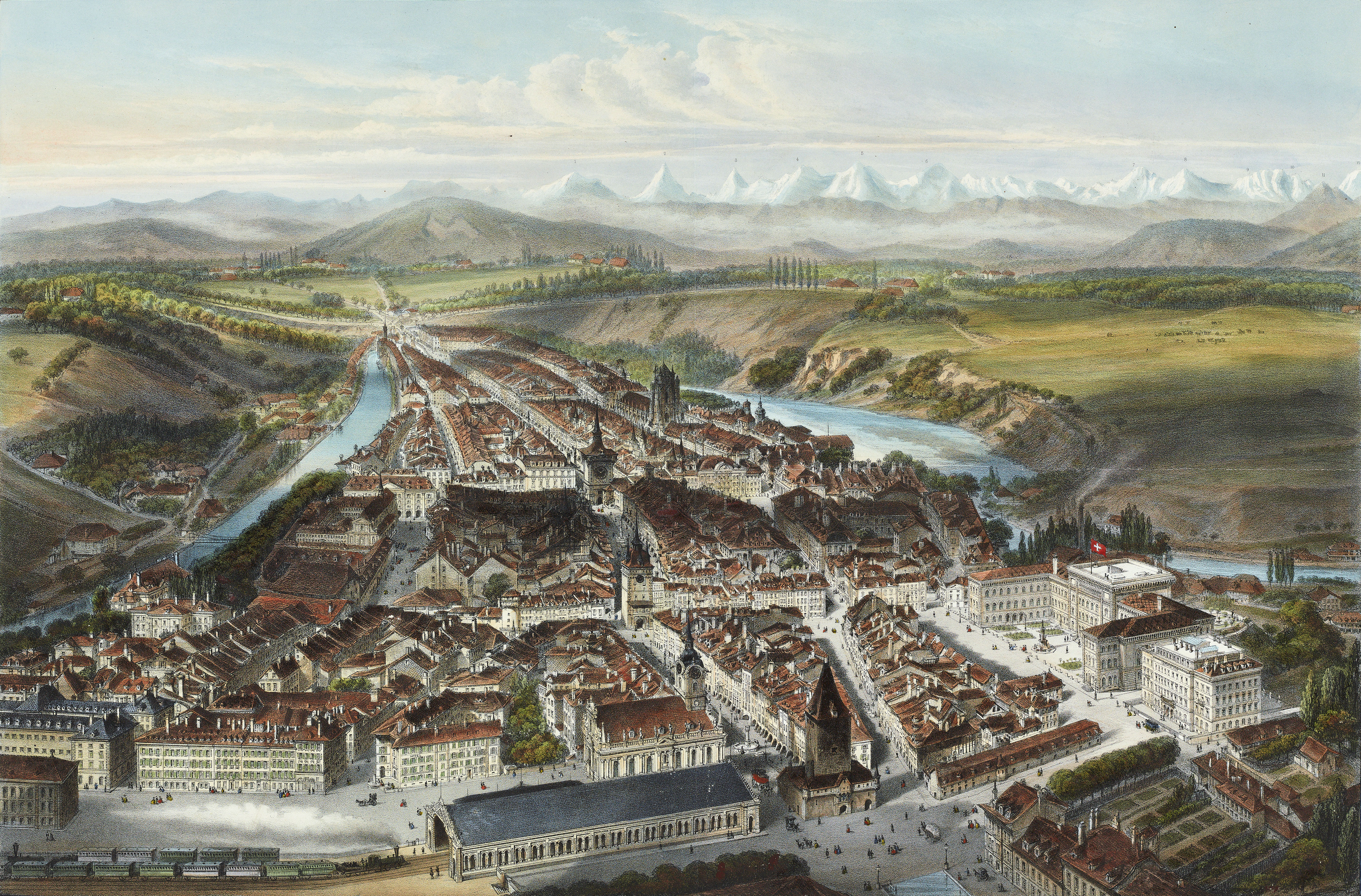
Bird's-eye view of Bern from the west, 1858. Lithography by Charles Fichot

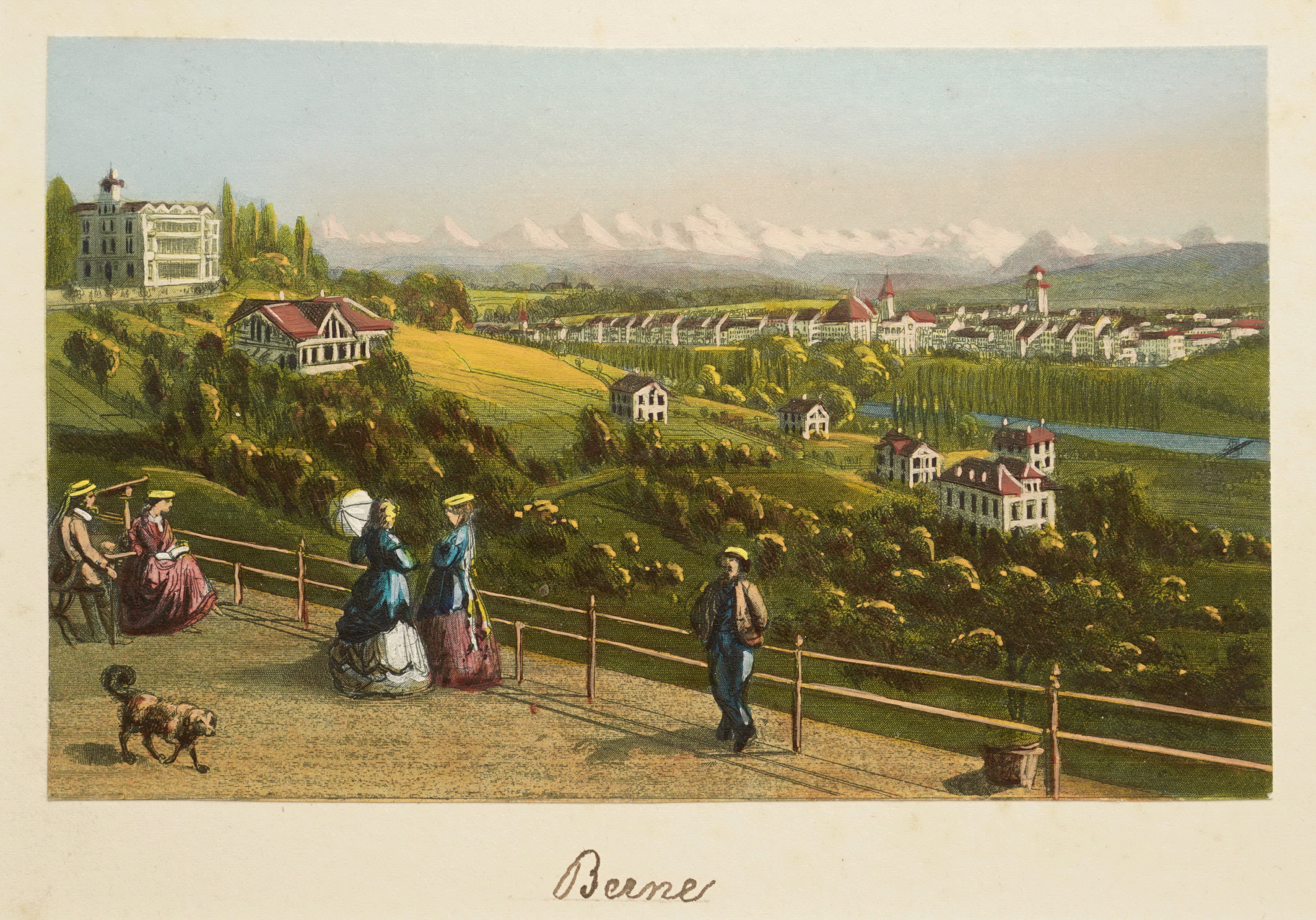
View of Bern and the Bernese Alps from "Schänzli", c. 1870. Etching by Heinrich Müller

Bern was occupied by French troops in 1798 during the French Revolutionary Wars, when it was stripped of parts of its territories. It regained control of the Bernese Oberland in 1802, and following the Congress of Vienna of 1814, it newly acquired the Bernese Jura. At this time, it once again became the largest canton of the Confederacy as it stood during the Restoration and until the secession of the canton of Jura in 1979.

On 28 November 1848, during the revolutions that year, a majority of the new Swiss Federal Assembly deputies chose Bern as the Federal City (seat of the government) of the newly created Swiss federal state, ahead of Zurich and Lucerne. Bern was chosen as not to concentrate all the power in the economic powerhouse of Zurich, while Catholic and conservative Lucerne had been part of the Sonderbund during the war a year before. In addition, Bern had a more central location and was supported by the French-speaking cantons due to proximity to them. However, the constitution doesn't define Bern as official capital of Switzerland, but as the seat of government.

A number of congresses of the socialist First and Second Internationals were held in Bern, particularly during World War I when Switzerland was neutral; see Bern International.

The city's population rose from about 5,000 in the 15th century to about 12,000 by 1800 and to above 60,000 by 1900, passing the 100,000 mark during the 1920s. Population peaked during the 1960s at 165,000 and has since decreased slightly, to below 130,000 by 2000. As of September 2017, the resident population stood at 142,349, of which 100,000 were Swiss citizens and 42,349 (31%) resident foreigners. A further estimated 350,000 people live in the immediate urban agglomeration.

== Geography and climate ==
=== Topography ===
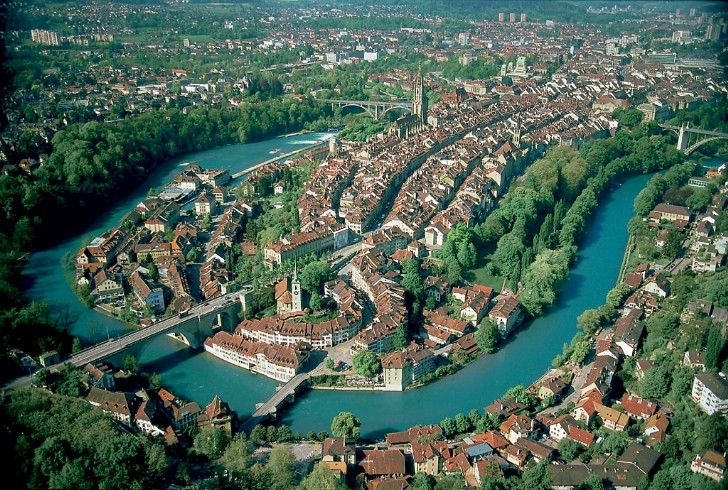
Aerial view of the Old City of Bern and the Aare

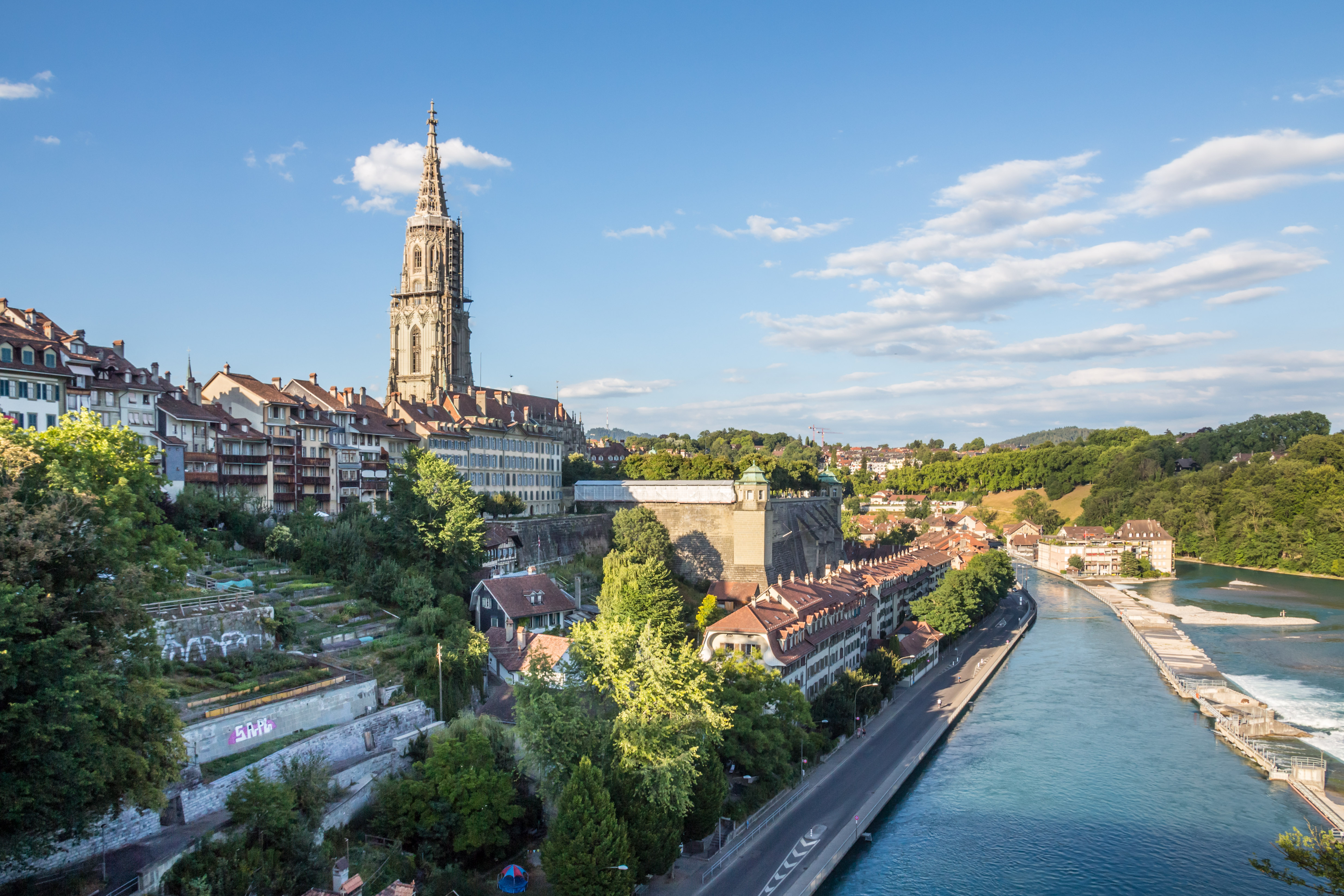
The Old City with the Minster and its platform above the lower Matte quarter and the Aare

The Aare flows in a wide loop around the Old City.

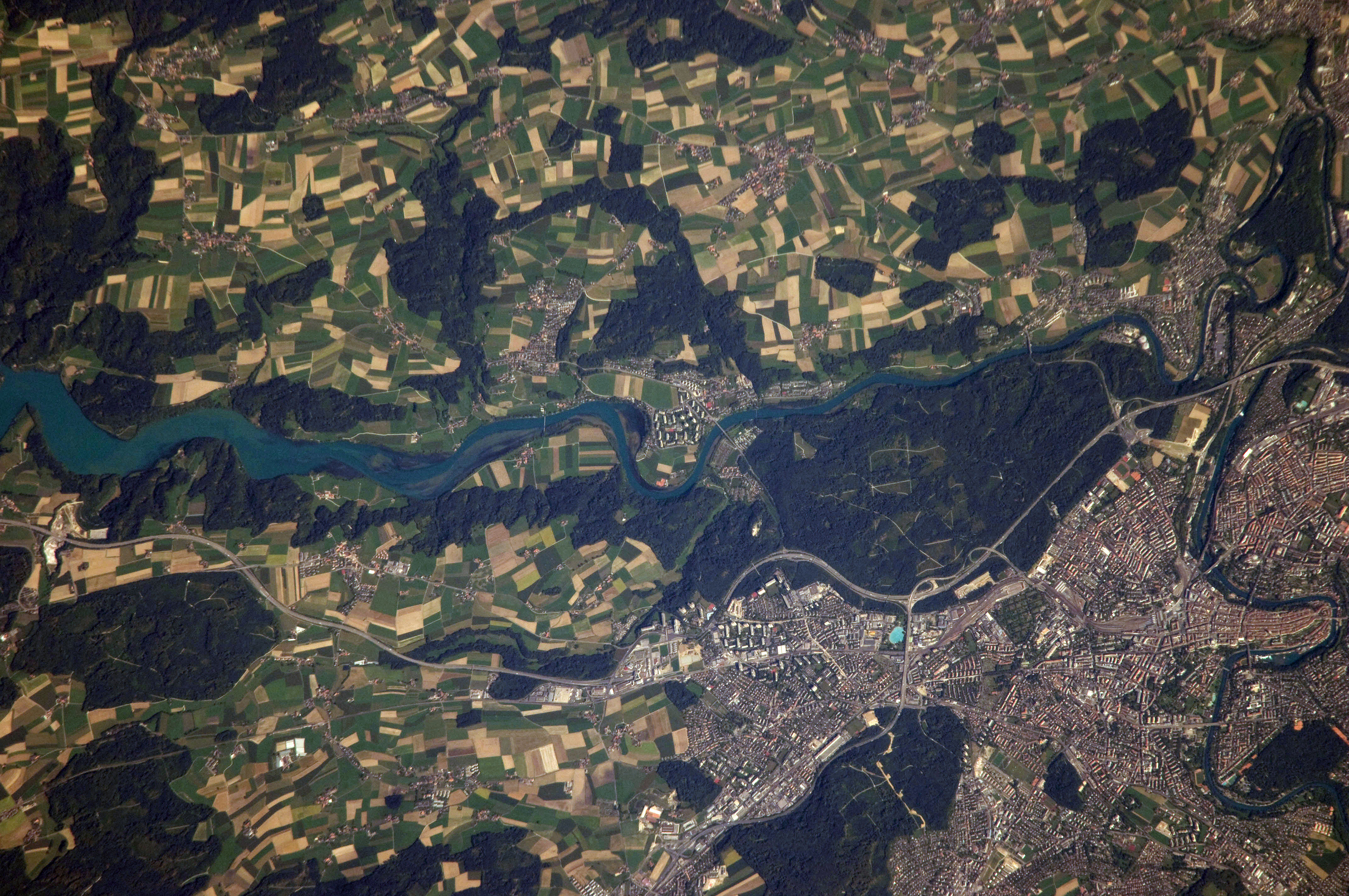
View of Bern from the ISS. The Old City is on the lower right-hand side.

Bern lies on the Swiss Plateau in the canton of Bern, slightly west of the centre of Switzerland and 20 km (12 mi) north of the Bernese Alps. The countryside around Bern was formed by glaciers during the most recent ice age. The two mountains closest to Bern are Gurten with a height of 864 m (2,835 ft) and Bantiger with a height of 947 m (3,107 ft). The site of the old observatory in Bern is the point of origin of the CH1903 coordinate system at 46°57′08.66″N 7°26′22.50″E.

The city was originally built on a hilly peninsula surrounded by the river Aare, but outgrew natural boundaries by the 19th century. A number of bridges have been built to allow the city to expand beyond the Aare.

Bern is built on very uneven ground. An elevation difference of up to 60 metres exists between the inner city districts on the Aare (Matte, Marzili) and the higher ones (Kirchenfeld, Länggasse).

Bern has an area, as of 2013, of 51.62 km^{2} (19.93 sq mi). Of this area, 9.42 km^{2} (3.64 sq mi) or 18.2% is used for agricultural purposes, while 17.21 km^{2} (6.64 sq mi) or 33.3% is forested. Of the rest of the land, 23.76 km^{2} (9.17 sq mi) or 46.0% is settled (buildings or roads), 1.08 km^{2} (0.42 sq mi) or 2.1% is either rivers or lakes, and 0.14 km^{2} (0.054 sq mi) or 0.3% is unproductive land.

Of the developed area of Bern, 3.1% consists of industrial buildings, 22.3% housing and other buildings, and 12.9% is devoted to transport infrastructure. Power and water infrastructure, as well as other special developed areas, made up 1.2% of the city, while another 6.5% consists of parks, green belts, and sports fields.

Of Bern's total land area, 32.8% is heavily forested. Of the agricultural land, 13.3% is used for growing crops and 4.4% is designated to be used as pasture. Local rivers and streams provide all the water in the municipality.

=== Climate ===
According to the Köppen Climate Classification, Bern has an oceanic climate (Cfb) closely bordering on a humid continental climate (Dfb).

The closest weather station near Bern is located in the municipality of Zollikofen, about 5 kilometres (3 mi) north of the city centre. The warmest month for Bern is July, with a daily mean temperature of 18.3 °C (64.9 °F), and a daily maximum temperature of 24.3 °C (75.7 °F). The highest temperature recorded at Bern / Zollikofen is 37.0 °C (98.6 °F), recorded in August 2003. On average, a temperature of 25 °C (77 °F) or above is recorded 40.7 days per year, and 6 days per year with a temperature of 30 °C (86 °F) or above at Zollikofen, and the warmest day reaches an average of 32.1 °C (89.8 °F).

There are 103.7 days of air frost, and 22.3 ice days per year at Bern (Zollikofen) for the period of 1981–2010, as well as 14.1 days of snowfall, 36.7 days of snow cover per year and the average amount of snow measured per year is 52.6 centimetres (20.7 in). On average, January is the coldest month, with a daily mean temperature of −0.4 °C (31.3 °F), and a daily minimum temperature of −3.6 °C (25.5 °F). The lowest temperature ever recorded at Bern (Zollikofen) was −23.0 °C (−9.4 °F), recorded in February 1929, and typically the coldest temperature of the year reaches an average of −12.8 °C (9.0 °F) for the period of 1981–2010.

Climate data for Bern (Zollikofen), elevation: 553 m (1,814 ft), 1991–2020 normals, extremes 1901–present
Month	Jan	Feb	Mar	Apr	May	Jun	Jul	Aug	Sep	Oct	Nov	Dec	Year
Record high °C (°F)	15.9 (60.6)	18.5 (65.3)	23.0 (73.4)	28.2 (82.8)	31.4 (88.5)	33.7 (92.7)	36.8 (98.2)	37.0 (98.6)	31.6 (88.9)	25.5 (77.9)	20.8 (69.4)	19.1 (66.4)	37.0 (98.6)
Mean daily maximum °C (°F)	3.4 (38.1)	5.2 (41.4)	10.3 (50.5)	14.5 (58.1)	18.6 (65.5)	22.5 (72.5)	24.6 (76.3)	24.2 (75.6)	19.4 (66.9)	14.0 (57.2)	7.7 (45.9)	3.8 (38.8)	14.0 (57.2)
Daily mean °C (°F)	0.2 (32.4)	1.1 (34.0)	5.2 (41.4)	9.0 (48.2)	13.2 (55.8)	16.9 (62.4)	18.8 (65.8)	18.4 (65.1)	14.1 (57.4)	9.5 (49.1)	4.2 (39.6)	0.9 (33.6)	9.3 (48.7)
Mean daily minimum °C (°F)	−2.9 (26.8)	−2.8 (27.0)	0.3 (32.5)	3.4 (38.1)	7.6 (45.7)	11.3 (52.3)	13.0 (55.4)	12.9 (55.2)	9.2 (48.6)	5.5 (41.9)	1.0 (33.8)	−2.1 (28.2)	4.7 (40.5)
Record low °C (°F)	−21.8 (−7.2)	−23.0 (−9.4)	−15.6 (3.9)	−7.9 (17.8)	−2.2 (28.0)	0.9 (33.6)	3.6 (38.5)	3.5 (38.3)	−0.8 (30.6)	−5.5 (22.1)	−13.9 (7.0)	−20.5 (−4.9)	−23.0 (−9.4)
Average precipitation mm (inches)	60.3 (2.37)	55.5 (2.19)	64.9 (2.56)	78.0 (3.07)	112.4 (4.43)	101.5 (4.00)	108.0 (4.25)	112.3 (4.42)	87.0 (3.43)	86.5 (3.41)	76.9 (3.03)	78.5 (3.09)	1,021.8 (40.23)
Average snowfall cm (inches)	10.7 (4.2)	11.0 (4.3)	5.4 (2.1)	1.1 (0.4)	0.1 (0.0)	0.0 (0.0)	0.0 (0.0)	0.0 (0.0)	0.0 (0.0)	0.5 (0.2)	5.1 (2.0)	13.7 (5.4)	47.6 (18.7)
Average precipitation days (≥ 1.0 mm)	9.5	8.7	9.5	9.6	12.1	11.4	10.8	11.0	8.6	10.4	10.1	10.6	122.3
Average snowy days (≥ 1.0 cm)	3.6	3.2	1.6	0.4	0.0	0.0	0.0	0.0	0.0	0.1	1.1	3.2	13.2
Average relative humidity (%)	84	79	73	70	72	72	71	73	79	84	86	86	77
Mean monthly sunshine hours	66.1	94.4	151.3	179.3	197.1	225.5	245.2	227.8	175.2	119.1	66.0	53.1	1,797.1
Percentage possible sunshine	26	35	44	47	45	50	55	56	50	38	26	22	43
Source 1: NOAA
Source 2: MeteoSwissKNMI

== Politics ==
=== Subdivisions ===
The municipality is administratively subdivided into six districts (Stadtteile), each of which consists of several quarters (Quartiere).

=== Government ===
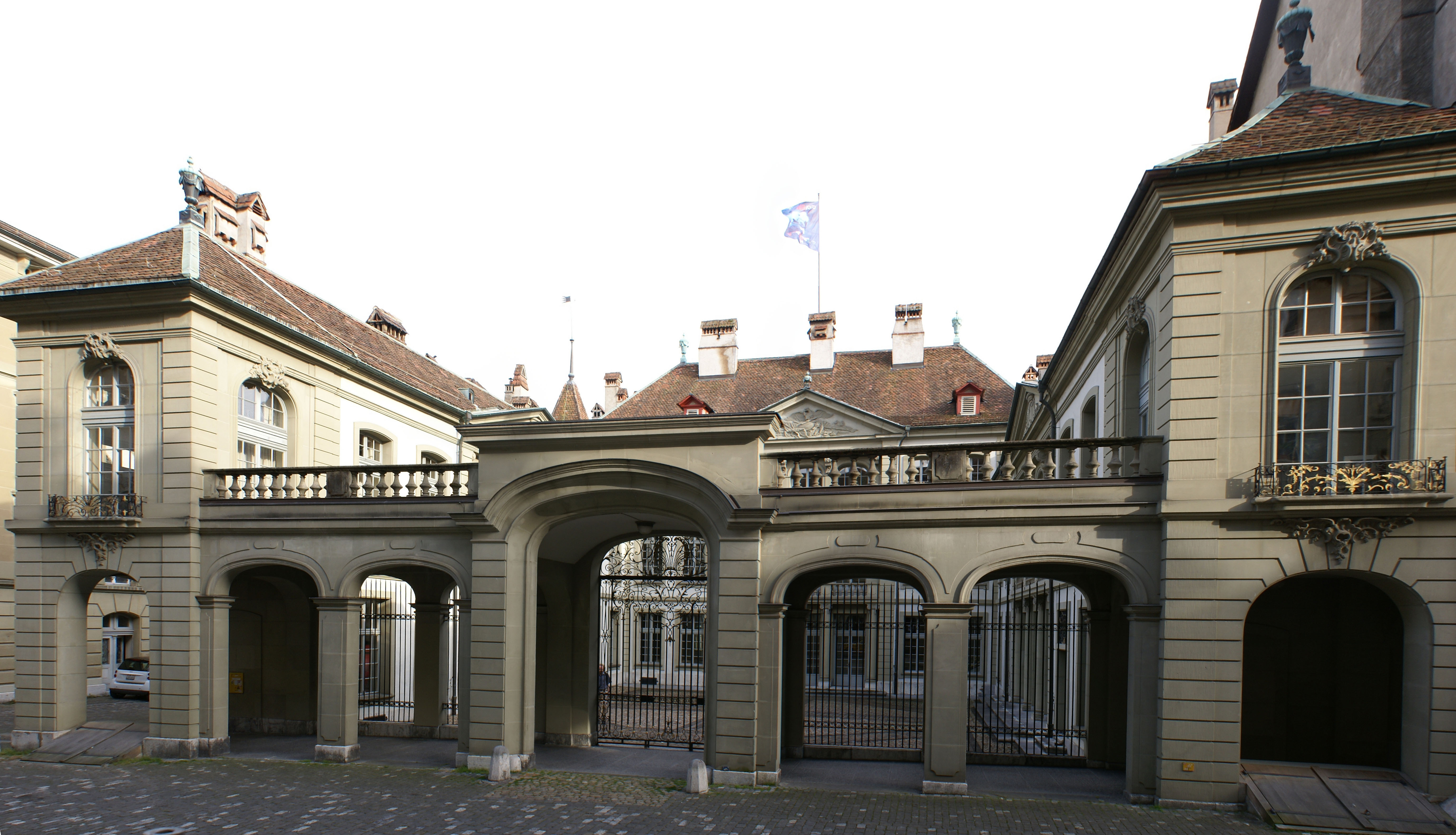
Erlacherhof

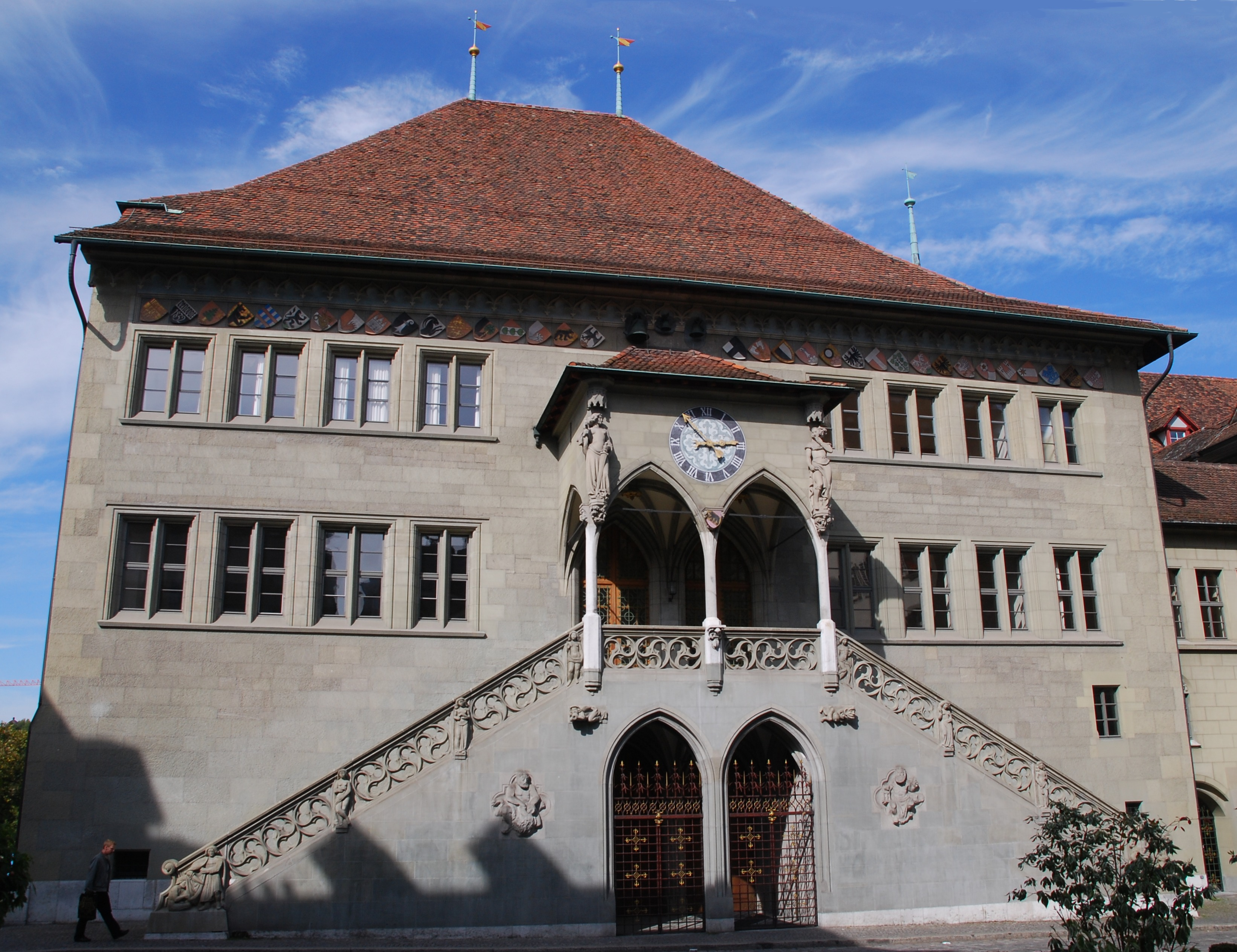
Rathaus

The Municipal Council (de: Gemeinderat, fr: conseil municipal) constitutes the executive government of the City of Bern and operates as a collegiate authority. It is composed of five councillors (German: Gemeinderat/-rätin, French: conseiller/conseillère municipal(e)), each presiding over a directorate (de: Direktion, fr: direction) comprising several departments and bureaus. The president of the executive department acts as mayor (de: Stadtpräsident/-präsidentin, fr: Le Maire). In the mandate period (Legislatur) 2025–2028, the Municipal Council is presided by Stadtpräsidentin Marieke Kruit. Departmental tasks, coordination measures and implementation of laws decreed by the City Council are carried by the Municipal Council. The regular election of the Municipal Council by any inhabitant valid to vote is held every four years. Any resident of Bern allowed to vote can be elected as a member of the Municipal Council. Contrary to most other municipalities, the executive government in Bern is selected by means of a system of Proporz. The mayor is elected as such as well by public election while the heads of the other directorates are assigned by the collegiate. The executive body holds its meetings in the Erlacherhof, built by architect Albrecht Stürler after 1747.

As of 2025, Bern's Municipal Council is made up of two representatives of the SP (Social Democratic Party), and one each of GFL (Grüne Freie Liste a.k.a. Green Free List), GB (Green Alliance of Bern) and GLP (Green Liberal Party), giving the left parties a very strong majority of four out of five seats. The last regular election was held on 24 November 2024.

The Municipal Council (Gemeinderat) of Bern for the mandate period 2025–2028
Municipal Councillor (Gemeinderat/-rätin)	Party	Head of Directorate (Direktion, since) of	elected since
Marieke Kruit (Note: Mayor (Stadtpräsidentin))	SP	Mayor's Office (Präsidialdirektion (PRD), 2025)	2021
Alec von Graffenried (Note: Vice-Mayor (Vizepräsident))	GFL	Security, the Environment and Energy (Direktion für Sicherheit, Umwelt und Energie (SUE), 2025)	2017
Ursina Anderegg	GB	Education, Social Welfare and Sport (Direktion für Bildung, Soziales und Sport (BSS), 2025)	2025
Matthias Aebischer	SP	Civil Engineering, Transport and Green Spaces (Direktion für Tiefbau, Verkehr und Stadtgrün (TVS), 2025)	2025
Melanie Mettler	GLP	Finances, Personnel and IT (Direktion für Finanzen, Personal und Informatik (FPI), 2025)	2025

Dr. Claudia Mannhart is City Chronicler (Stadtschreiberin). She was elected by the Municipal Council in 2021.

=== Parliament ===
The Stadtrat of Bern for the mandate period of 2021–2024:
1. PdA (1.25%)
2. AL (3.75%)
3. GaP (1.25%)
4. JUSO (2.50%)
5. SP/PS (26.2%)
6. JA! (3.75%)
7. GB (12.5%)
8. GFL (8.75%)
9. jglp (2.50%)
10. glp/pvl (11.2%)
11. EVP/PEV (2.50%)
12. CVP/PDC (2.50%)
13. BDP/PBD (2.50%)
14. FDP/PLR (8.75%)
15. JF / DL (1.25%)
16. SVP/UDC (8.75%)

The City Council (de: Stadtrat, fr: Conseil de ville) holds legislative power. It is made up of 80 members, with elections held every four years. The City Council decrees regulations and by-laws that are executed by the Municipal Council and the administration. The delegates are selected by means of a system of proportional representation.

The sessions of the City Council are public. Unlike members of the Municipal Council, members of the City Council are not politicians by profession, and they are paid a fee based on their attendance. Any resident of Bern allowed to vote can be elected as a member of the City Council. The parliament holds its meetings in the Stadthaus (Town Hall).

The last regular election of the City Council was held on 29 November 2020 for the mandate period (German: Legislatur, French: la législature) from 2021 to 2024. The City Council consist of 23 (-1) members of the Social Democratic Party (SP/PS) including two seats by the junior party JUSO, 11 (+3) Green Liberal Party (glp/pvl) including two member of its junior party jglp, 10 (+1) Green Alliance of Bern (GB), 8 (-1) The Liberals (FDP/PLR) including one seat by its junior partner JF / DL, 7 (-2) Swiss People's Party (SVP/UDC), 7 (-1) Grüne Freie Liste (GFL) (Green Free List), 3 (+1) Junge Alternative (JA!) (or Young Alternatives), 3 (+1) Alternative Linke Bern (AL), 2 (-1) Conservative Democratic Party (BDP/PBD), 2 (-) Christian Democratic People's Party (CVP/PDC), 2 (-) Evangelical People's Party (EVP/PEV), 1 (-) Swiss Party of Labour (PdA), and 1 Grüne alternative Partei (GaP) (or Green alternative Party).

=== National elections ===
==== National Council ====
In the 2019 federal election for the Swiss National Council the most popular party was the PS which received 28.7% (-5.6) of the vote. The next five most popular parties were the Green Party (25.2%, +7.9), the pvl (13.5%, +4.1), the UDC (9.5%, -2.9), PLR (4.2%, -2.8), and the BDP/PBD (7.0%). In the federal election a total of 49,030 votes were cast, and the voter turnout was 56%.

In the 2015 federal election for the Swiss National Council the most popular party was the PS which received 34.3% of the vote. The next five most popular parties were the Green Party (17.4%), the UDC (12.4%), and the FDP/PLR (9.9%), glp/pvl (9.4%), and the BDP/PBD (7.0%). In the federal election, a total of 48,556 voters were cast, and the voter turnout was 56.0%.

=== International relations ===
==== Twin and sister cities ====
The Municipal Council of the city of Bern decided against having twinned cities except for a temporary (during the UEFA Euro 2008) cooperation with the Austrian city Salzburg.

== Demographics ==
Bern population pyramid in 2021

Largest groups of foreign residents 2012
Nationality	Number	% total (foreigners)
Germany	5,957	4.7 (20.0)
Italy	4,113	3.2 (13.5)
Spain	1,977	1.6 (6.5)
Portugal	1,433	1.1 (4.7)
Turkey	1,161	0.9 (3.8)
North Macedonia	1,120	0.9 (3.7)
Kosovo	1,085	0.9 (3.6)
Sri Lanka	898	0.7 (3.0)
Serbia	898	0.7 (3.0)
France	668	0.5 (2.2)
Austria	629	0.5 (2.1)

Historical population
Year	Pop.	±%
1850	29,670	—
1860	31,050	+4.7%
1870	37,548	+20.9%
1880	45,743	+21.8%
1888	48,605	+6.3%
1900	67,550	+39.0%
1910	90,937	+34.6%
1920	104,626	+15.1%
1930	111,783	+6.8%
1941	130,331	+16.6%
1950	146,499	+12.4%
1960	163,172	+11.4%
1970	162,405	−0.5%
1980	145,254	−10.6%
1990	136,338	−6.1%
2000	128,634	−5.7%
2010	124,381	−3.3%
2020	134,794	+8.4%

Bern has a population (as of December 2020) of 134,794. About 34% of the population are resident foreign nationals. Over the 10 years between 2000 and 2010, the population changed at a rate of 0.6%. Migration accounted for 1.3%, while births and deaths accounted for −2.1%.

Most of the population (as of 2000) spoke German (104,465 or 81.2%) as their first language; Italian was the second most common (5,062 or 3.9%) and French third (4,671 or 3.6%). There were 171 people who spoke Romansh.

As of 2008, the population was 47.5% male and 52.5% female. The population was made up of 44,032 Swiss men (35.4% of the population) and 15,092 (12.1%) non-Swiss men. There were 51,531 Swiss women (41.4%) and 13,726 (11.0%) non-Swiss women. Of the population in the municipality, 39,008 or about 30.3% were born in Bern and lived there in 2000. There were 27,573 or 21.4% who were born in the same canton, while 25,818 or 20.1% were born somewhere else in Switzerland, and 27,812 or 21.6% were born outside of Switzerland.

As of 2000, children and teenagers (0–19 years old) made up 15.1% of the population, while adults (20–64 years old) were 65% and seniors (over 64 years old) comprised 19.9%.

As of 2000, there were 59,948 people who were single and never married in the municipality. There were 49,873 married individuals, 9,345 widows or widowers and 9,468 individuals who are divorced.

As of 2000, there were 67,115 private households in the municipality, and an average of 1.8 persons per household. There were 34,981 households that consist of only one person and 1,592 households with five or more people. In 2000, a total of 65,538 apartments (90.6% of the total) were permanently occupied, while 5,352 apartments (7.4%) were seasonally occupied and 1,444 apartments (2.0%) were empty. As of 2009, the construction rate of new housing units was 1.2 new units per 1000 residents.

As of 2003 the average price to rent an average apartment in Bern was 1108.92 Swiss francs (CHF) per month (US$890, £500, €710 approx. exchange rate from 2003). The average rate for a one-room apartment was 619.82 CHF (US$500, £280, €400), a two-room apartment was about 879.36 CHF (US$700, £400, €560), a three-room apartment was about 1040.54 CHF (US$830, £470, €670) and a six or more room apartment cost an average of 2094.80 CHF (US$1680, £940, €1340). The average apartment price in Bern was 99.4% of the national average of 1116 CHF. The vacancy rate for the municipality, in 2010, was 0.45%.

=== Historical population ===
The historical population is given in the following chart:

Historical population data
Year	Total population	German-speaking	French-speaking	Protestant	Catholic	Jewish	Christian Catholic	Other or no religion given	No religion given	Swiss	Non-Swiss
1700	14,219										
1730	15,932										
1764	14,515										
1798	12,186										
1818	18,997										
1837	24,362										
1850	29,670			27,986	1,478		206			28,009	1,661
1880	44,087	41,784	1,875	39,948	3,456		387	296		40,463	3,624
1910	90,937	83,144	4,566	78,234	9,650		1,056	1,997		81,335	9,602
1930	111,783	102,444	6,378	95,600	13,280		854	2,049		104,864	6,919
1950	146,499	129,781	10,262	118,823	23,295	1,089	792	2,500		139,367	7,132
1970	162,405	133,737	8,041	115,779	41,374	635	561	4,056		139,873	22,532
1990	136,338	110,279	5,236	79,889	36,723	335	334	19,057	10,006	112,599	23,739

=== Religion ===
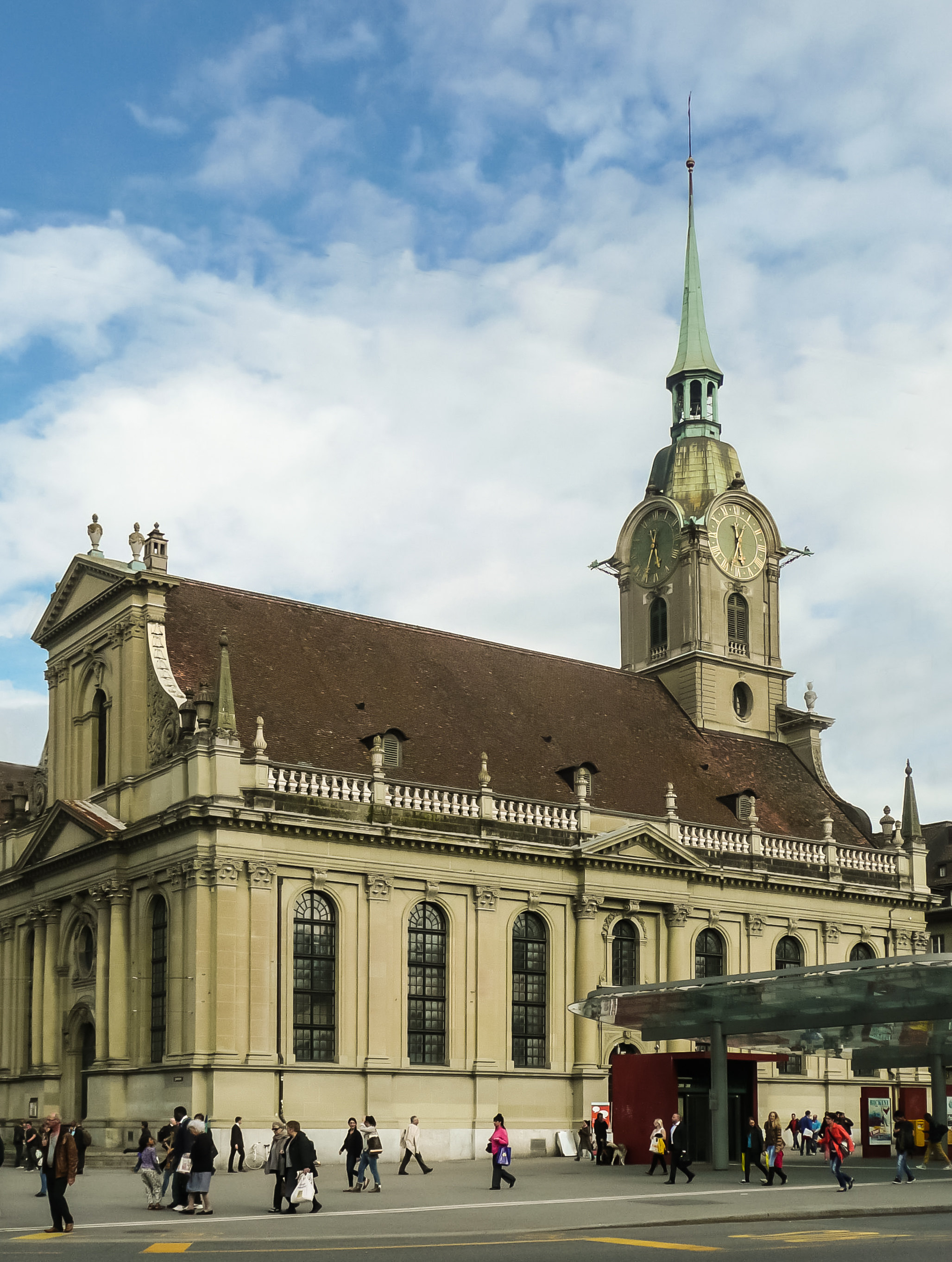
Church of the Holy Ghost

From the 2000 census, 60,455 or 47.0% belonged to the Swiss Reformed Church, while 31,510 or 24.5% were members of the Catholic Church. Of the rest of the population, there were 1,874 members of an Orthodox church (or about 1.46% of the population), there were 229 persons (or about 0.18% of the population) who belonged to the Christ Catholic Church, and there were 5,531 persons (or about 4.30% of the population) who belonged to another Christian religion. There were 324 persons (or about 0.25% of the population) who were Jewish, and 4,907 (or about 3.81% of the population) who were Muslim. There were 629 persons who were Buddhist, 1,430 persons who were Hindu and 177 persons who belonged to another religion. 16,363 (or about 12.72% of the population) belonged to no religion, are agnostic or atheist, and 7,855 persons (or about 6.11% of the population) did not answer the question. On 14 December 2014 the Haus der Religionen was inaugurated.

== Main sights ==
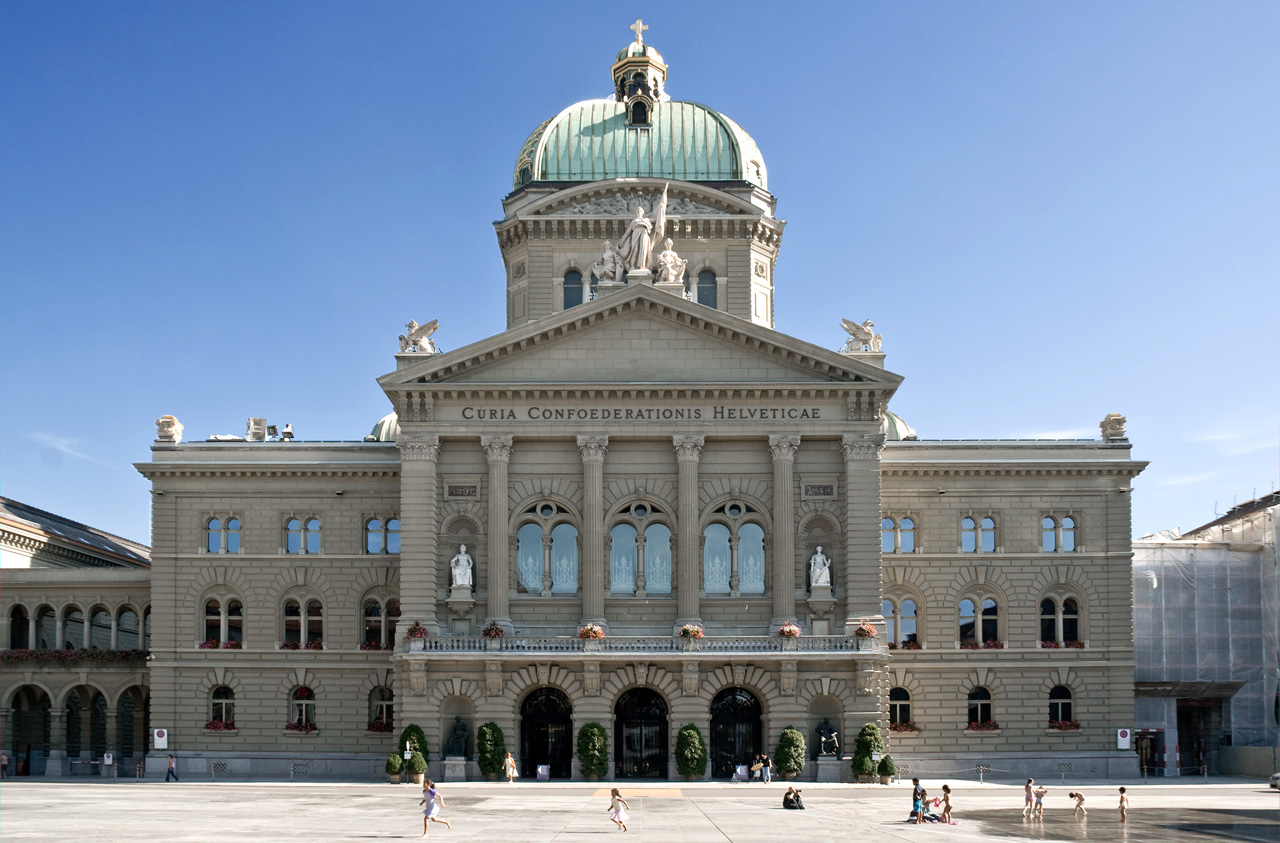
The central building of the Federal Palace of Switzerland

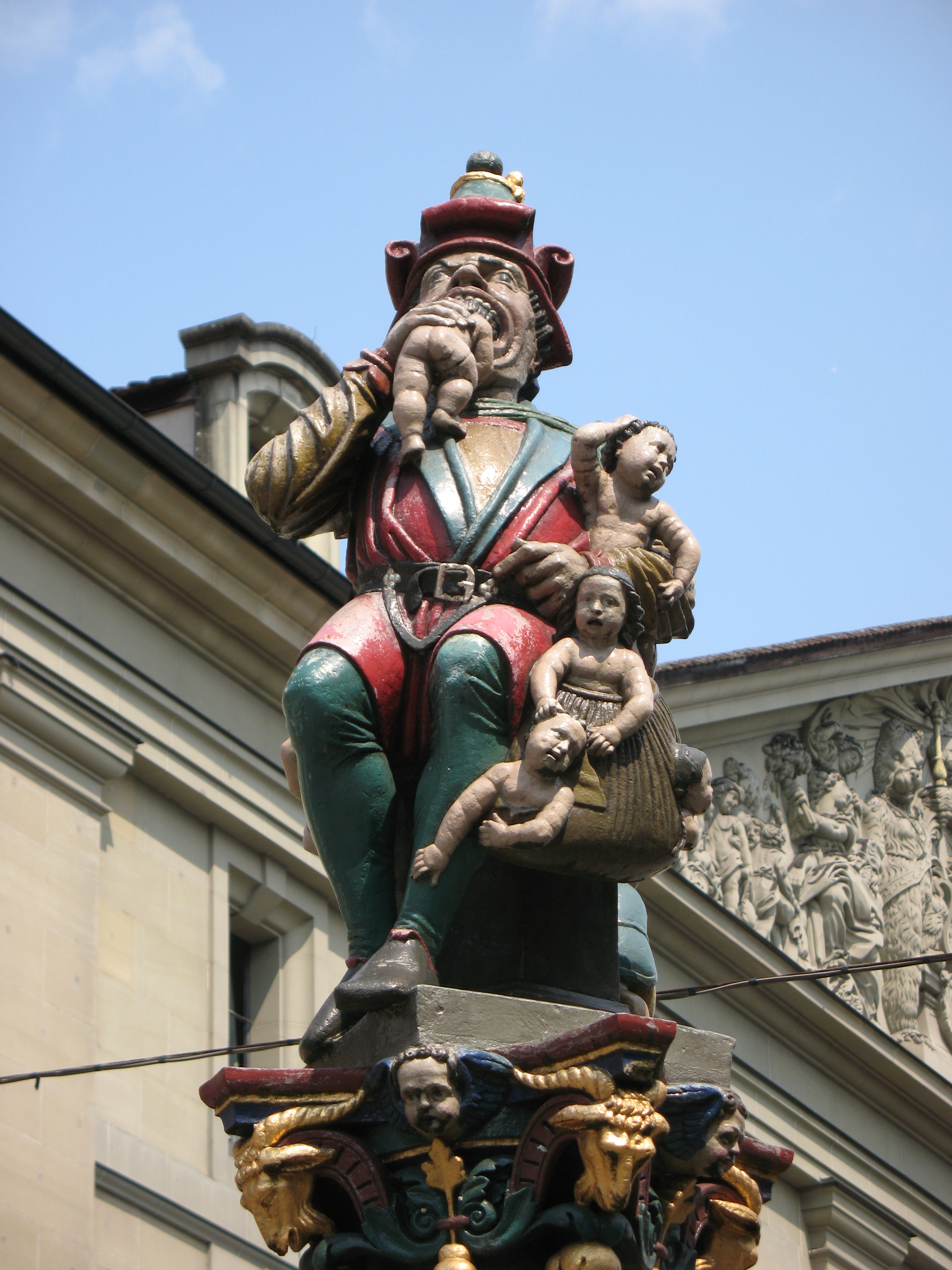
The ogre of the Kindlifresserbrunnen has a sack of children waiting to be devoured.

The structure of Bern's city centre is largely medieval and has been recognised by UNESCO as a Cultural World Heritage Site. Its best-known sight is the Zytglogge (Bernese German for "Time Bell"), an elaborate medieval clock tower with moving puppets. It also has a 15th-century Gothic cathedral, the Münster, and a 15th-century town hall. Thanks to 6 kilometres (4 miles) of arcades, the old town has one of the longest covered shopping promenades in Europe.

Since the 16th century, the city has had a bear pit, the Bärengraben, at the far end of the Nydeggbrücke to house its heraldic animals. The four bears are now kept in an open-air enclosure nearby, and two other young bears, a present by the Russian president, are kept in Dählhölzli zoo.

The Federal Palace (Bundeshaus), built from 1857 to 1902, which houses the national parliament, government and part of the federal administration, can also be visited.

Albert Einstein lived in a flat at the Kramgasse 49, the site of the Einsteinhaus, from 1903 to 1905, the year in which the Annus Mirabilis papers were published.

The Rose Garden (Rosengarten), from which a scenic panoramic view of the medieval town centre can be enjoyed, is a well-kept Rosarium on a hill, converted into a park from a former cemetery in 1913.

There are eleven Renaissance allegorical statues on public fountains in the Old Town. Nearly all the 16th-century fountains, except the Zähringer fountain, which was created by Hans Hiltbrand, are the work of the Fribourg master Hans Gieng. One of the more interesting fountains is the Kindlifresserbrunnen (Bernese German: Child Eater Fountain), which is claimed to represent a Jew, the Greek god Chronos, or a Fastnacht figure meant to frighten disobedient children.

Bern's most recent sight is the set of fountains in front of the Federal Palace. It was inaugurated on 1 August 2004.

The Universal Postal Union is situated in Bern. A commemorative monument is also in the city.

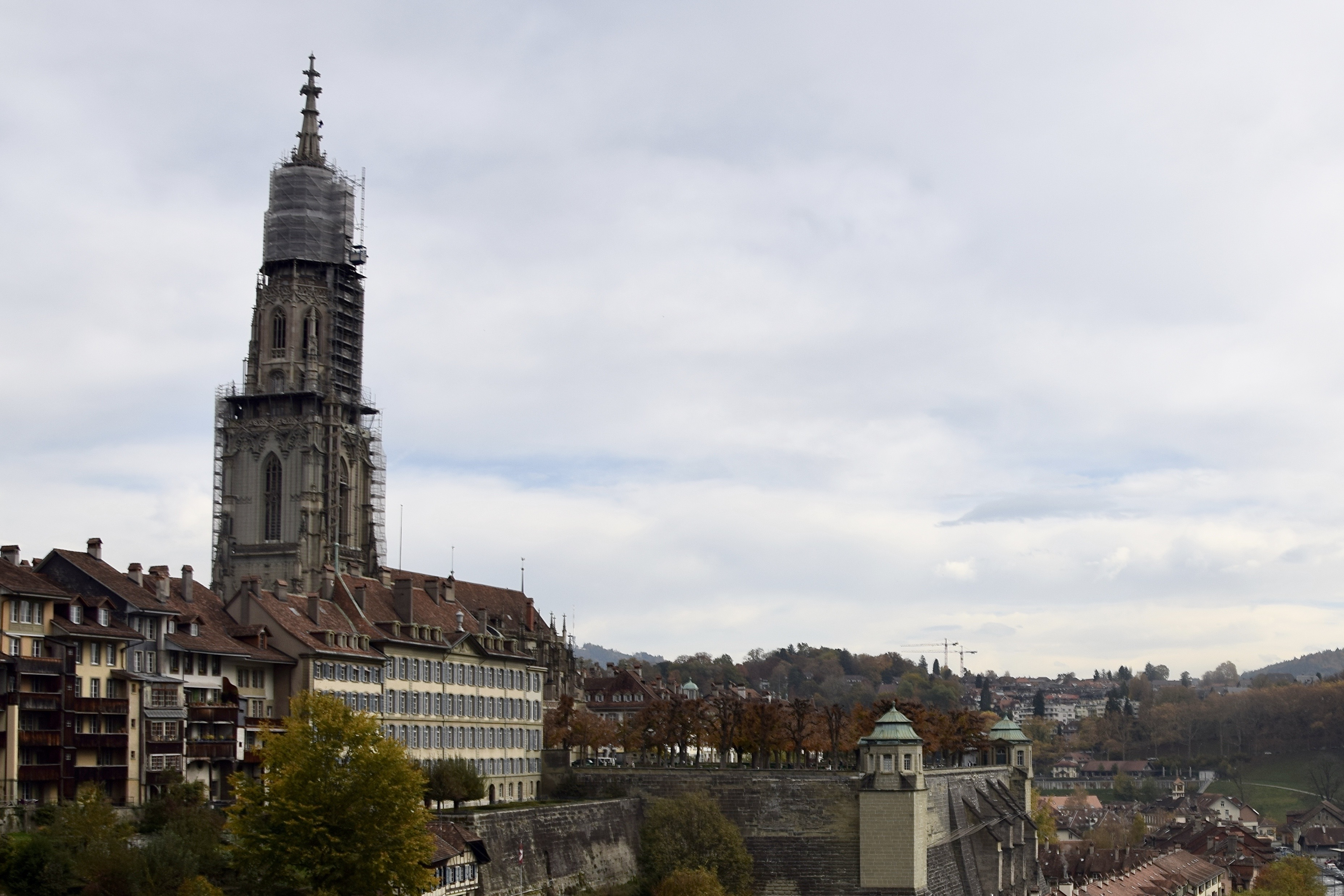
The Gothic Münster

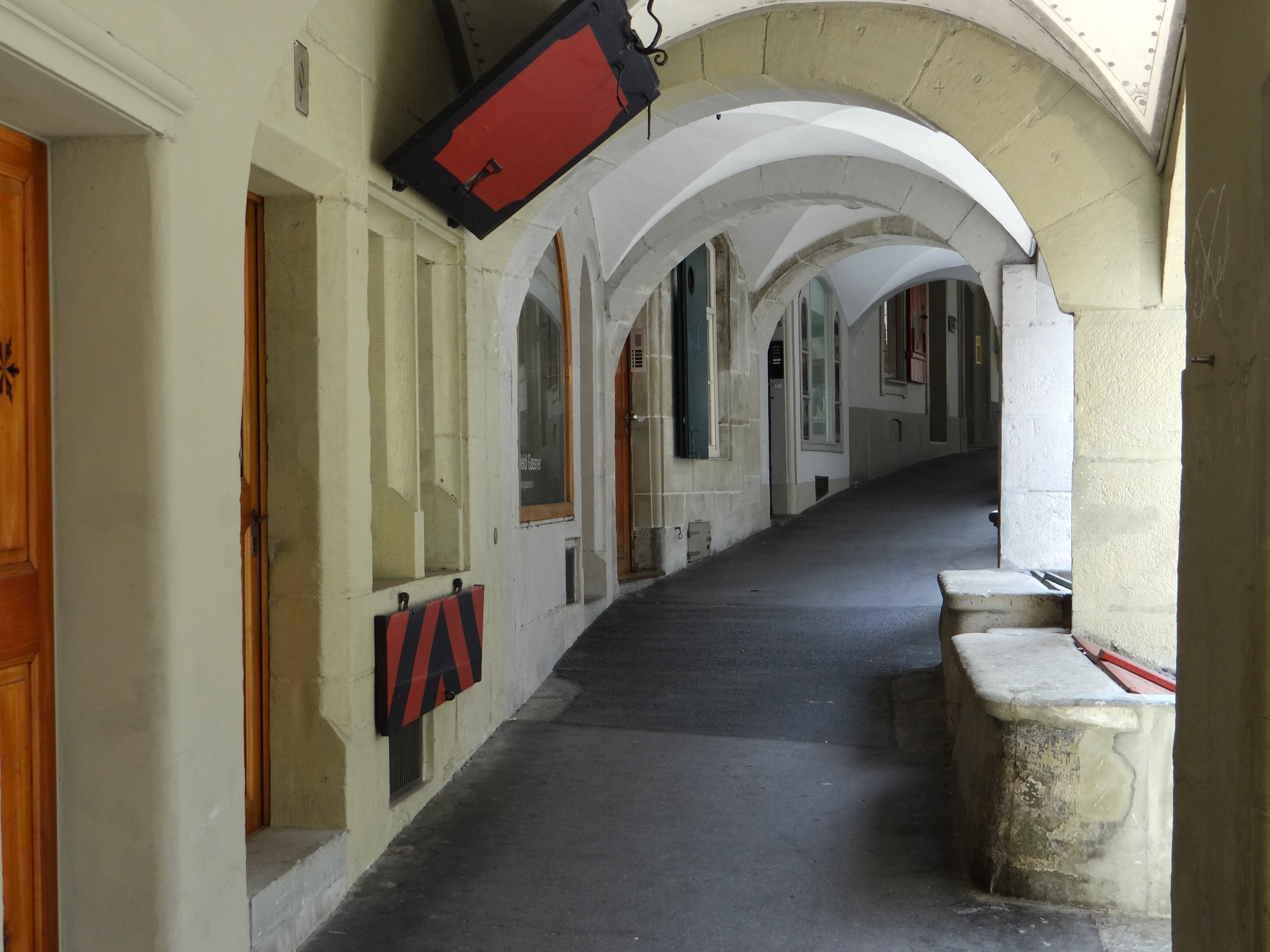
The Lauben, the old town's covered arcades

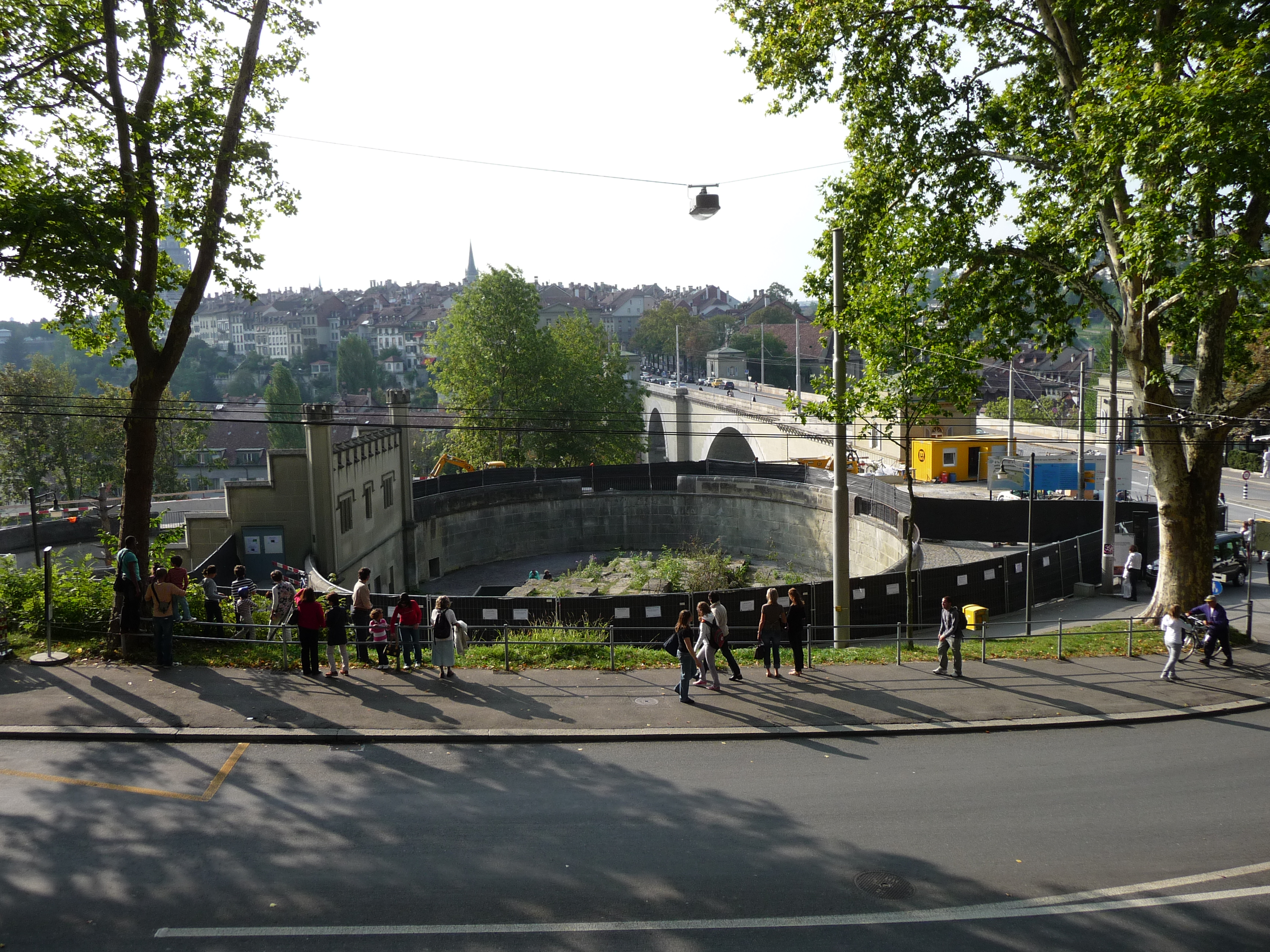
The bear pit, kept by the city since the 16th century

=== Heritage sites of national significance ===
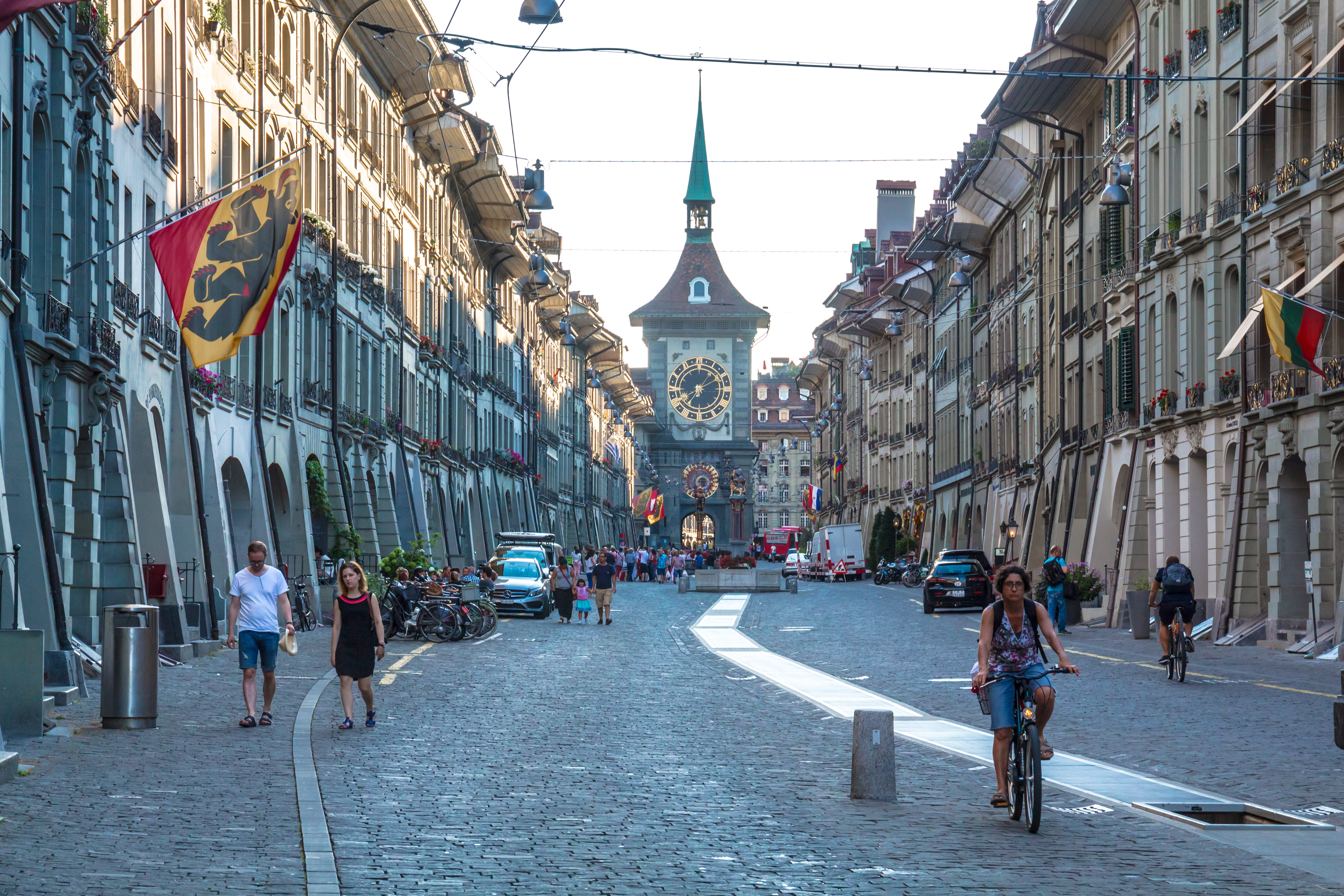
The Zytglogge clock tower and the city's medieval covered shopping promenades (Lauben)

Bern is home to 114 Swiss heritage sites of national significance.

The list includes the entire Old Town, which is also a UNESCO World Heritage Site, and many sites within and around it. Among the most notable within the Old Town are the Cathedral, which was started in 1421 and is the tallest cathedral in Switzerland, the Zytglogge and Käfigturm towers, which mark two successive expansions of the Old Town, the Holy Ghost Church, which is one of the largest Swiss Reformed churches in Switzerland, and eleven 16th-century fountains, most attributed to Hans Gieng.

Outside the Old Town, the heritage sites include the Bärengraben (Bear Pit), the Gewerbeschule Bern (1937), the Eidgenössisches Archiv für Denkmalpflege, the Kirchenfeld mansion district (after 1881), the Thunplatzbrunnen, the Federal Mint building, the Federal Archives, the Swiss National Library, the Historical Museum (1894), Alpine Museum, Museum of Communication and Natural History Museum.

== Culture ==
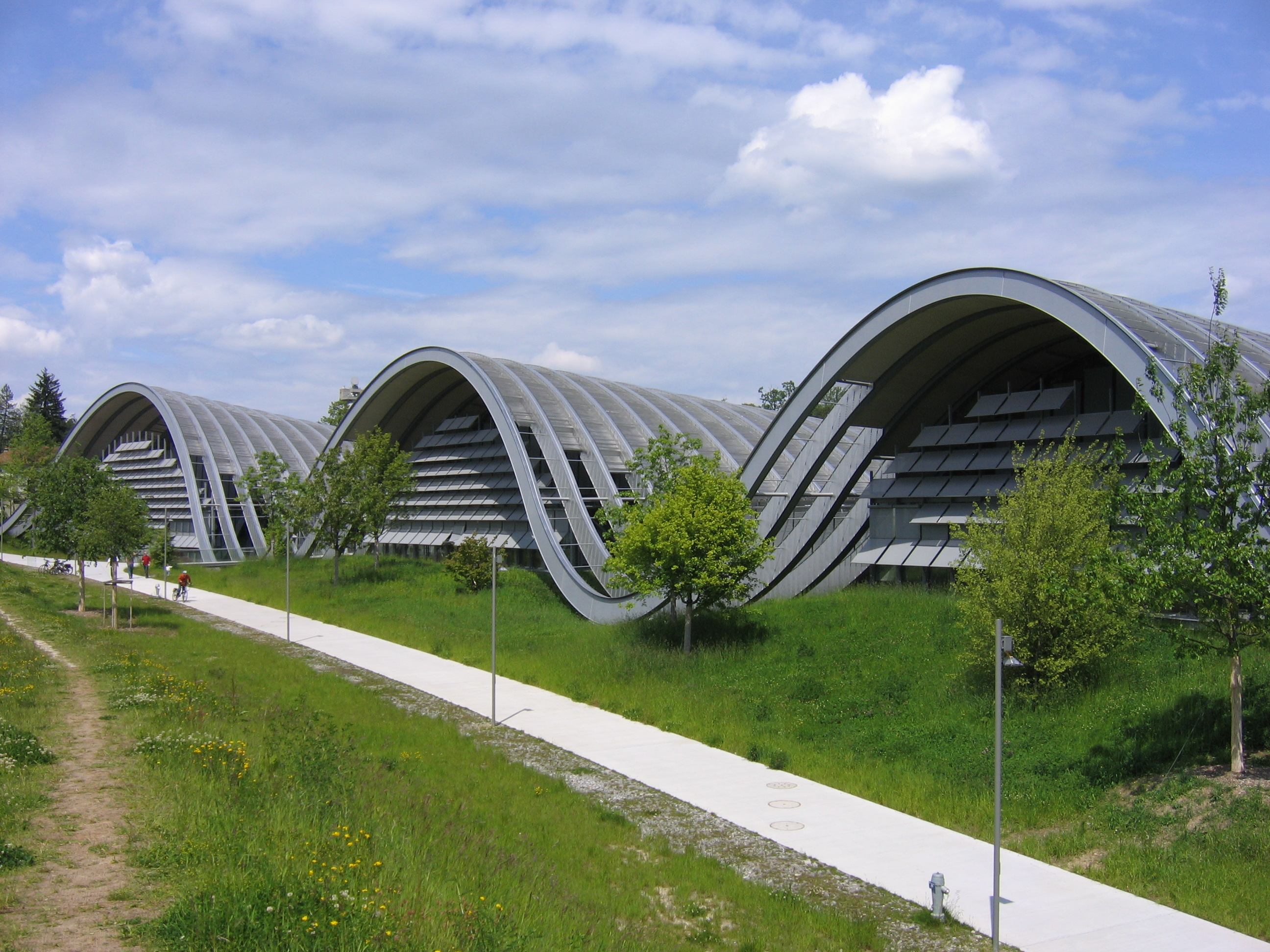
Zentrum Paul Klee

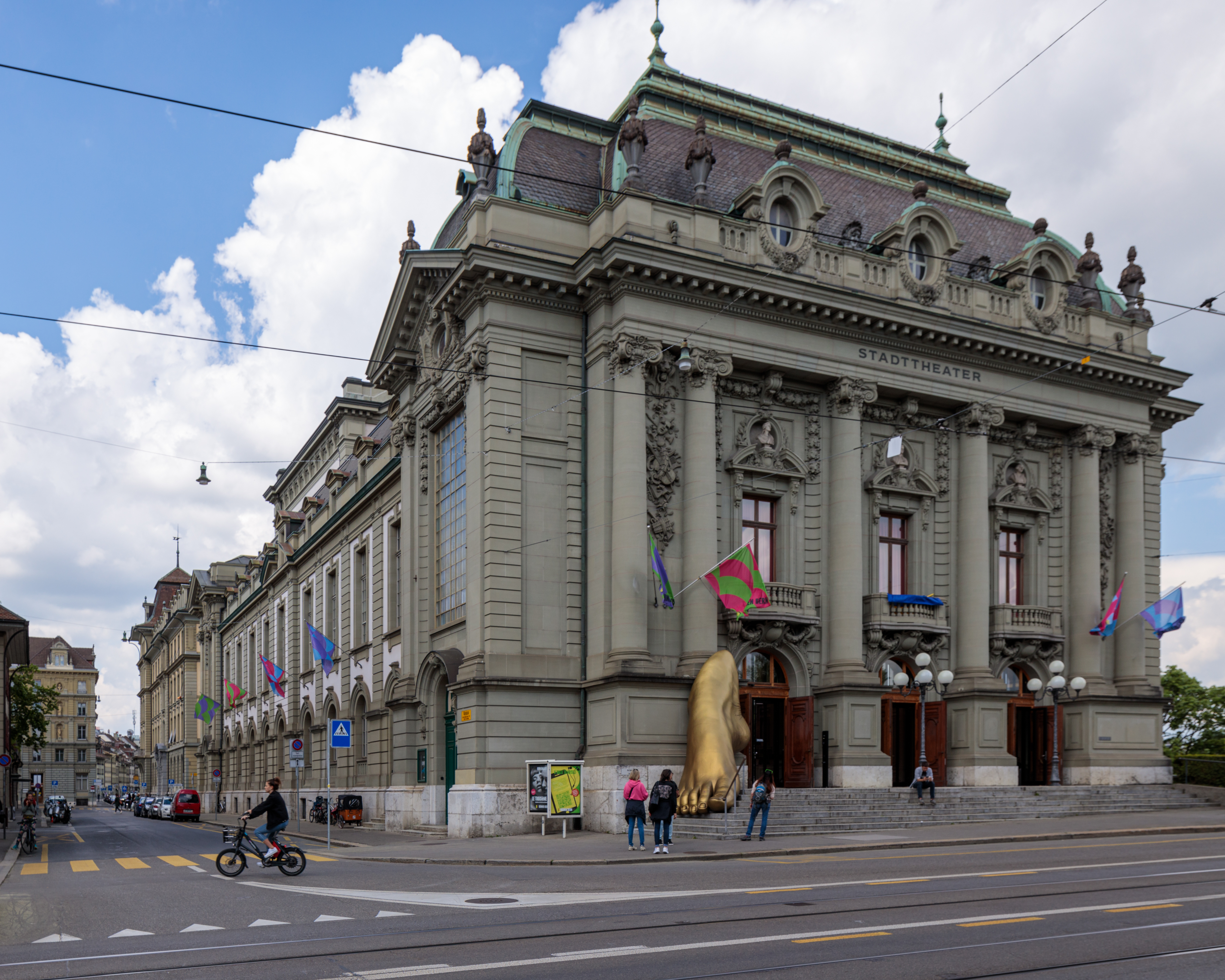
Stadttheater

=== Theatres ===
- Bern Theatre
- Narrenpack Theatre Bern
- Schlachthaus Theatre
- Tojo Theater
- The Theatre on the Effinger-Street
- Theatre am Käfigturm

=== Cinemas ===
Bern has several dozen cinemas. As is customary in German Switzerland, films are generally in German. Some films in select cinemas are shown in their original language with German and French subtitles.

=== Film festivals ===
- shnit International Shortfilmfestival, held annually in early October.
- Queersicht – gay and lesbian film festival, held annually in the second week of November.

=== Festivals ===
- BeJazz Summer and Winter Festival
- Buskers Bern Street Music Festival
- Gurtenfestival
- Internationales Jazzfestival Bern
- Taktlos-Festival

=== Music events ===
The Musikpreis des Kantons Bern is an annual musical event where "Outstanding musicians which styles shape the Bern music scene" are honored.

=== Fairs ===
- Zibelemärit – The Zibelemärit (onion market) is an annual fair held on the fourth Monday in November.
- Bernese Fasnacht (Carnival)

== Sports ==
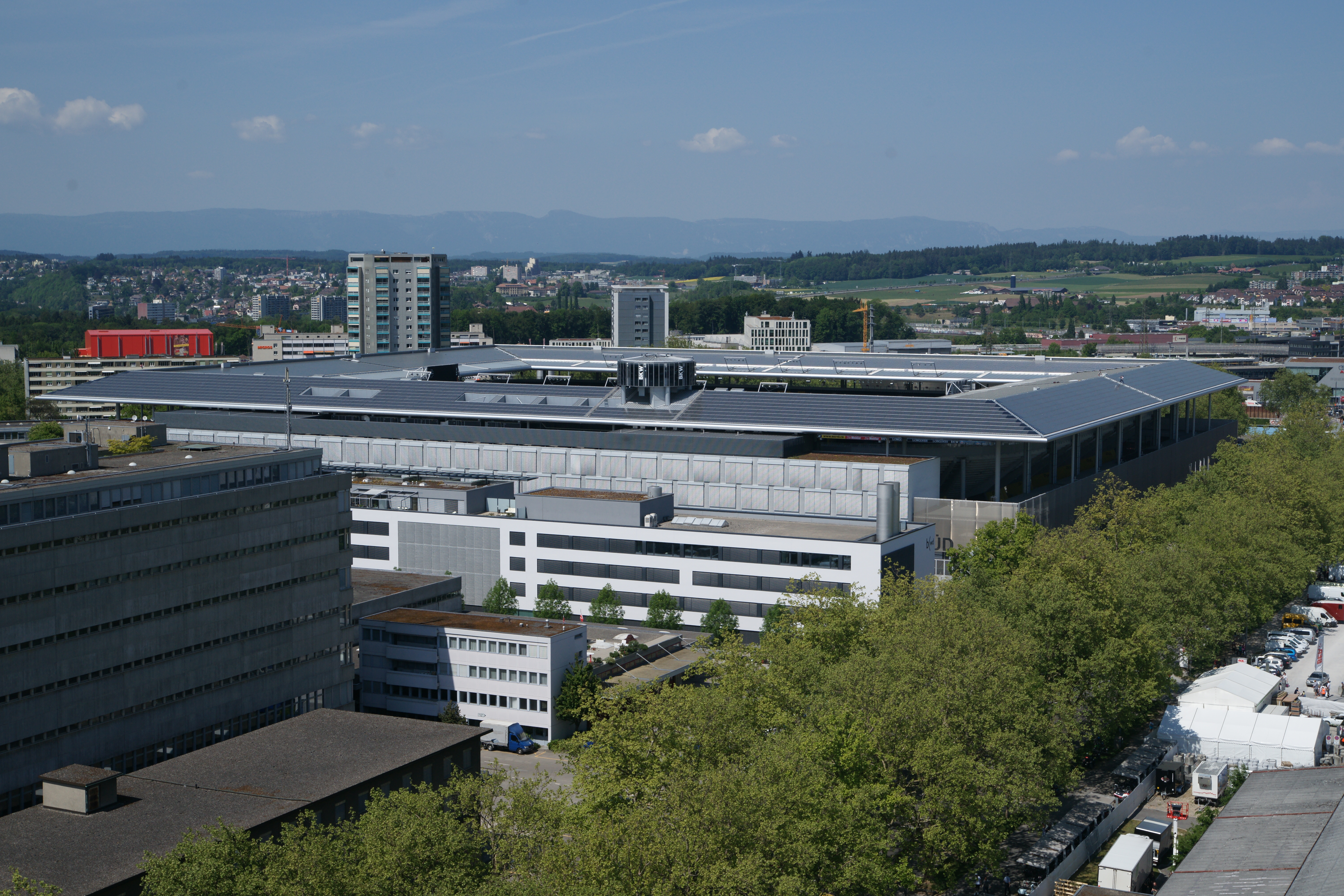
Stadion Wankdorf

Bern was the site of the 1954 FIFA World Cup Final, in which West Germany upset the Hungarian Golden Team 3–2. The football team BSC Young Boys is based in Bern at the Stadion Wankdorf, which also was one of the venues for the 2008 UEFA European Championship, in which it hosted three matches.

FC Breitenrain Bern, founded in 1994, also play in Bern.

SC Bern is the major ice hockey team of Bern which plays in the PostFinance Arena. They compete in the National League (NL), the highest league in Switzerland. The team has ranked highest in attendance for a European hockey team for more than a decade. PostFinance Arena was the main host of the 2009 IIHF Ice Hockey World Championship, including the opening game and the final of the tournament.

PostFinance Arena was also the host of the 2011 European Figure Skate Championships.

Bern Cardinals is the baseball and softball team of Bern, which plays at the Allmend.

Bern Grizzlies is the American football club in Bern (since 1985) and plays in the top level Nationalliga A (American football) at Athletics Arena Wankdorf. The Grizzlies have been Swiss Bowl champion six times.

Bern was a candidate to host the 2010 Winter Olympics, but withdrew its bid in September 2002 after a referendum was passed that showed that the bid was not supported by locals. Those games were eventually awarded to Vancouver, British Columbia.

RC Bern is the local rugby club (since 1972) and plays at the Allmend. The ladies team was founded in 1995.

The locality of Bremgartenwald was home to the Bremgarten Circuit, the Grand Prix motor racing course that at one time hosted the Swiss Grand Prix.

Bern Bears is an NGO Basketball Club since 2010 in city of Bern.

The Swiss Grand Prix was held on the Circuit Bremgarten street track from 1950 to 1954, with MotoGP also running their Swiss motorcycle Grand Prix from 1949 to 1954. The circuit eventually fell into disrepair after Switzerland banned motorsports after the 1955 Le Mans Disaster, but they made an amendment in 2015 to host electric racing, which is how the Swiss ePrix happened in 2019.

== Economy ==
In 2010, Bern had an unemployment rate of 3.3%. As of 2008, there were 259 people employed in the primary economic sector and about 59 businesses involved in this sector. 16,413 people were employed in the secondary sector and there were 950 businesses in this sector. 135,973 people were employed in the tertiary sector, with 7,654 businesses in this sector.

In 2008 the total number of full-time equivalent jobs was 125,037. The number of jobs in the primary sector was 203, of which 184 were in agriculture and 19 were in forestry or lumber production. The number of jobs in the secondary sector was 15,476 of which 7,650 or (49.4%) were in manufacturing, 51 or (0.3%) were in mining and 6,389 (41.3%) were in construction. The number of jobs in the tertiary sector was 109,358. In the tertiary sector; 11,396 or 10.4% were in wholesale or retail sales or the repair of motor vehicles, 10,293 or 9.4% were in the movement and storage of goods, 5,090 or 4.7% were in a hotel or restaurant, 7,302 or 6.7% were in the information industry, 8,437 or 7.7% were the insurance or financial industry, 10,660 or 9.7% were technical professionals or scientists, 5,338 or 4.9% were in education and 17,903 or 16.4% were in health care.

In 2000, there were 94,367 workers who commuted into the municipality and 16,424 workers who commuted away. The municipality is a net importer of workers, with about 5.7 workers entering the municipality for every one leaving. Of the working population, 50.6% used public transport to get to work, and 20.6% used a private car.

== Education ==
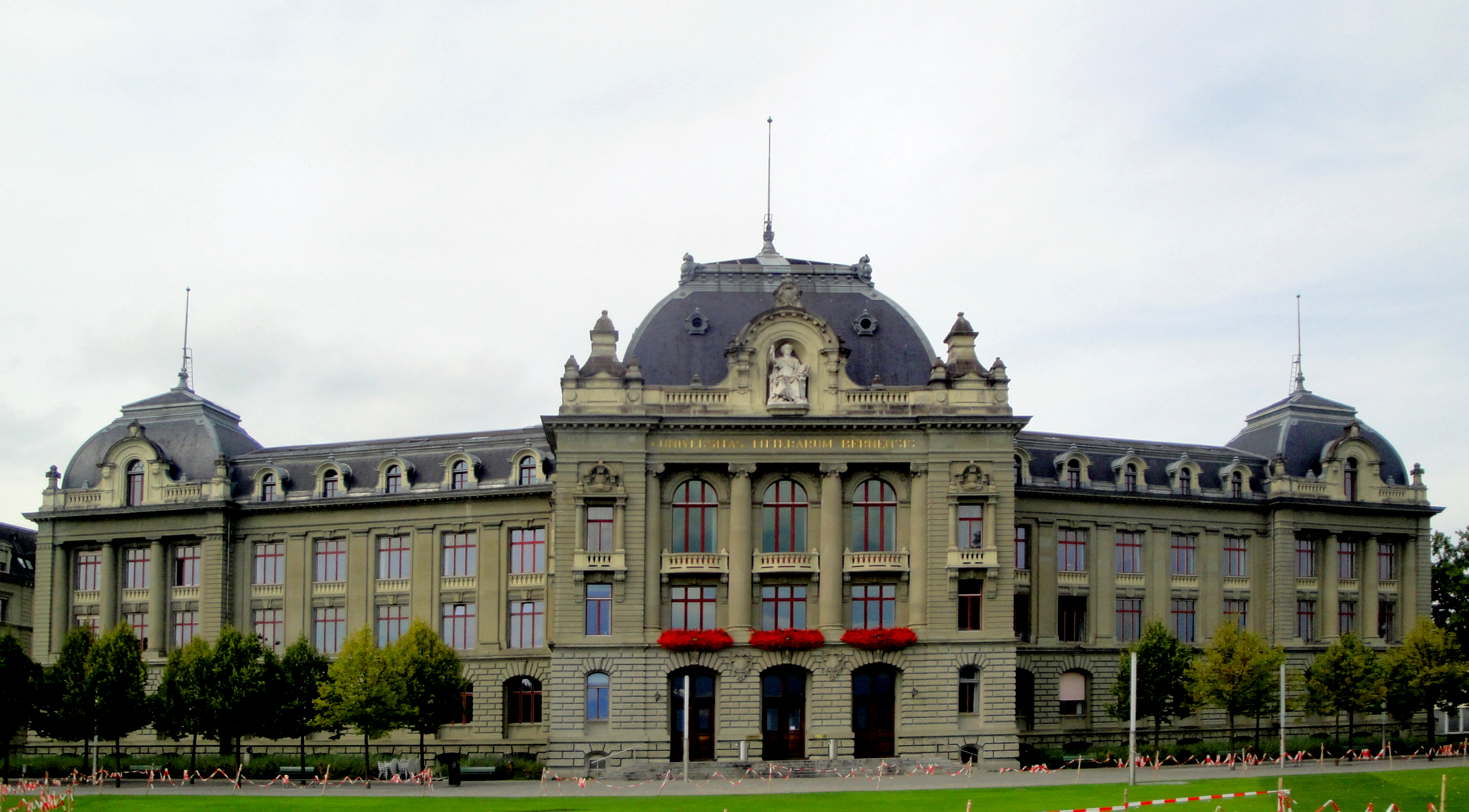
Main building of the University of Bern

The University of Bern, whose buildings are mainly located in the Länggasse quarter, is located in Bern, as well as the University of Applied Sciences (Fachhochschule) and several vocations schools.

In Bern, about 50,418 or (39.2%) of the population have completed non-mandatory upper secondary education, and 24,311 or (18.9%) have completed additional higher education (either university or a Fachhochschule). Of the 24,311 who completed tertiary schooling, 51.6% were Swiss men, 33.0% were Swiss women, 8.9% were non-Swiss men and 6.5% were non-Swiss women.

The canton of Bern school system provides one year of non-obligatory kindergarten, followed by six years of primary school. This is followed by three years of obligatory lower secondary school where the pupils are separated according to ability and aptitude. Following the lower secondary pupils may attend additional schooling or they may enter an apprenticeship.

During the 2009–10 school year, there were a total of 10,979 pupils attending classes in Bern. There were 89 kindergarten classes with a total of 1,641 pupils in the municipality. Of the kindergarten pupils, 32.4% were permanent or temporary residents of Switzerland (not citizens) and 40.2% have a different mother language than the classroom language. The municipality had 266 primary classes and 5,040 pupils. Of the primary pupils, 30.1% were permanent or temporary residents of Switzerland (not citizens) and 35.7% have a different mother language than the classroom language. During the same year, there were 151 lower secondary classes with a total of 2,581 pupils. There were 28.7% who were permanent or temporary residents of Switzerland (not citizens) and 32.7% have a different mother language than the classroom language.

Notable schools in Bern include Gymnasium Neufeld.

Bern is home to 8 libraries. These libraries include; the Schweiz. Nationalbibliothek/ Bibliothèque nationale suisse, the Universitätsbibliothek Bern, the Kornhausbibliotheken Bern, the BFH Wirtschaft und Verwaltung Bern, the BFH Gesundheit, the BFH Soziale Arbeit, the Hochschule der Künste Bern, Gestaltung und Kunst and the Hochschule der Künste Bern, Musikbibliothek. There was a combined total (as of 2008) of 10,308,336 books or other media in the libraries, and in the same year a total of 2,627,973 items were loaned out.

As of 2000, there were 9,045 pupils in Bern who came from another municipality, while 1,185 residents attended schools outside the municipality.

== Transport ==
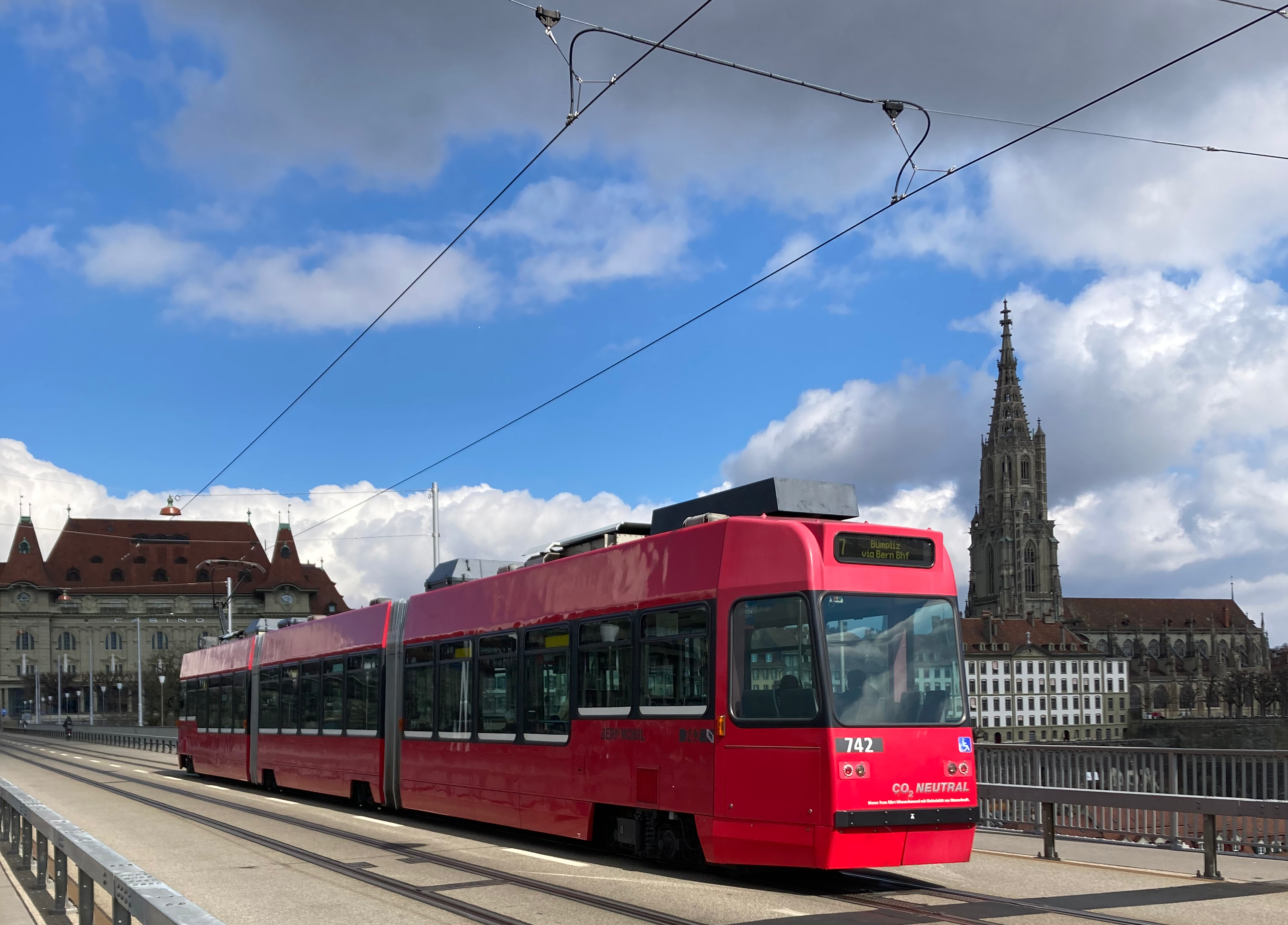
Tram on the Kirchenfeldbrücke, with the Bern Minster and Casino Bern in the background

=== Public transport ===
Bern is served by a dense network of trains, trams, trolleybuses, and conventional motorbuses. The Bern S-Bahn is Switzerland's second busiest.

Bern is the centre of the Libero tariff network, which covers the cantons of Bern and Solothurn and includes the towns of Biel/Bienne, Solothurn, and Thun. The network allows easy and coordinated travel on all modes of public transport, such as trains, PostAuto buses, trams, buses (trolleybuses and motorbuses) and others, regardless of transport operator. Fares are based on the number of zones in a journey. The central part of Bern, (excluding Bümpliz, Betlehem, Bottigen, Brünnen, and Riedbach in the west of the municipality), is part of the fare zone 100.

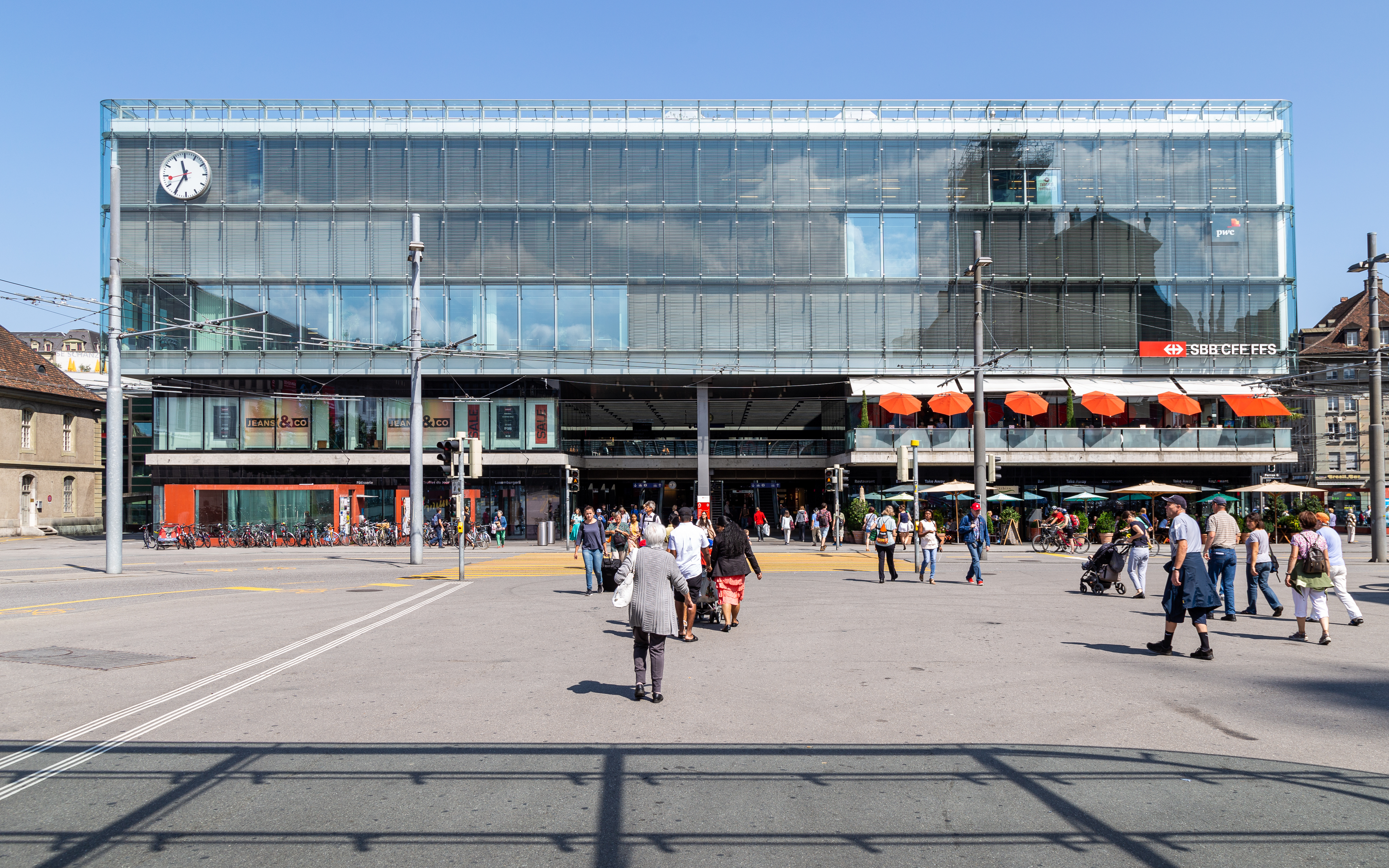
Bern railway station

The city is well served by railways, with the extensive S-Bahn network and many regional and international connections. Bern's central railway station (Bahnhof Bern) is Switzerland's second busiest station (164,800 passengers per weekday in 2022), and is the main transport hub in the region.

A funicular railway called the Marzilibahn leads from the Marzili district to the Federal Palace. With a length of 106 m (348 ft), it is the second shortest public railway in Europe after the Zagreb funicular.

=== Road traffic ===
Several Aare bridges connect the old parts of the city with the newer districts outside of the peninsula.

Bern is well connected to other cities by several motorways (A1, A12, A6).

=== Airport ===
Bern Airport (colloquially called Bern-Belp or Belpmoos) located outside the city near the town of Belp, as of March 2021 mostly serves general aviation and charter flights. Zurich Airport, Geneva Airport and EuroAirport Basel Mulhouse Freiburg serve as gateways for air traffic, all reachable in less than two hours by train or car from Bern.

=== Bicycle transport ===
The city has made efforts to make Bern the "bicycle capital" of Switzerland through the creation of better infrastructure, such as dedicated cycle paths. PubliBike operates a bike-sharing system.

== Notable people ==
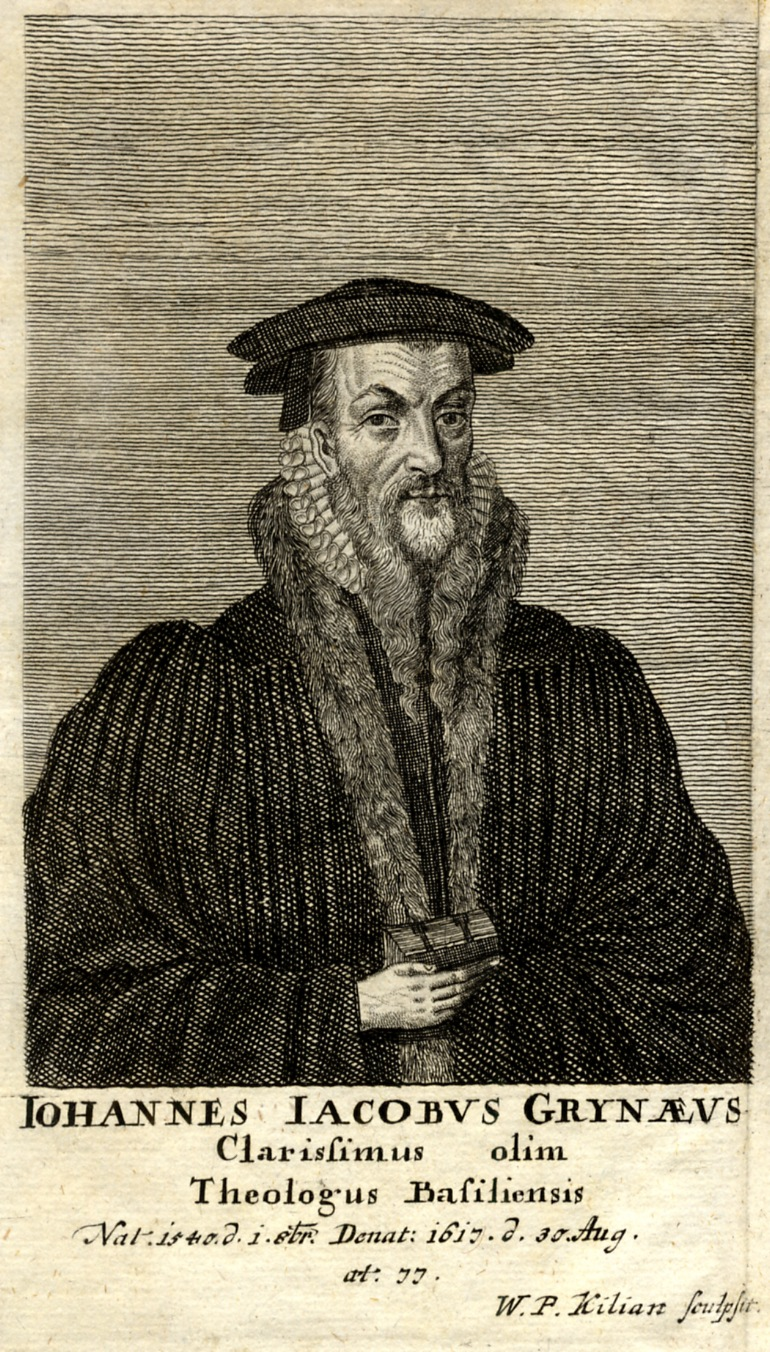
J J Grynaeus

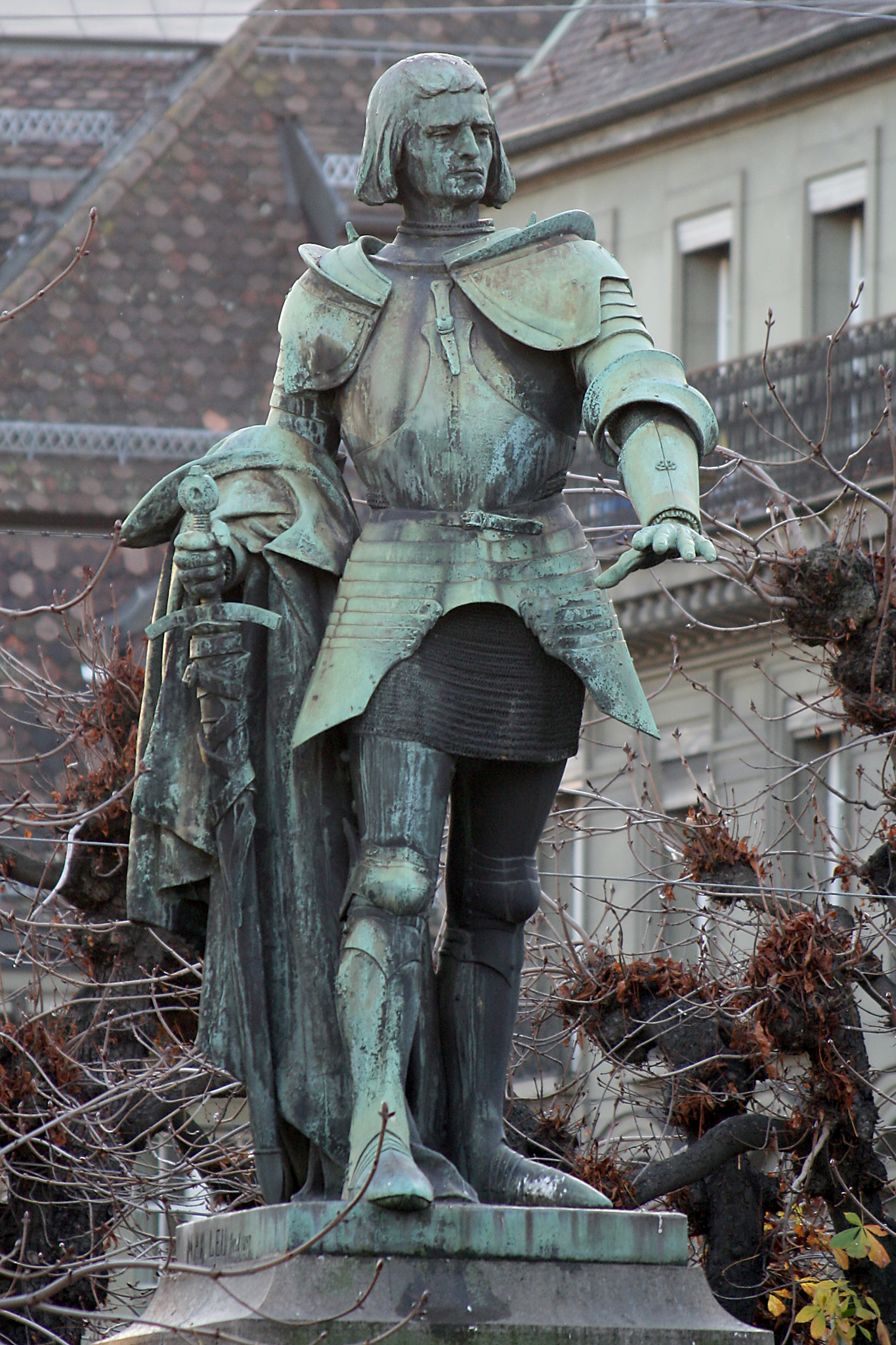
Statue of Adrian von Bubenberg

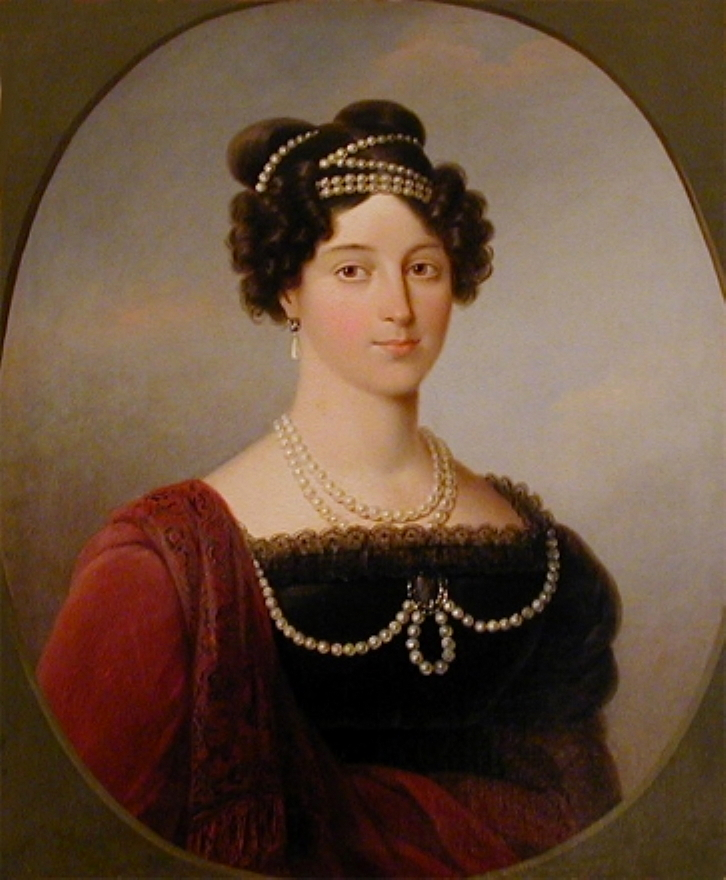
Anna Feodorovna, early 1800s

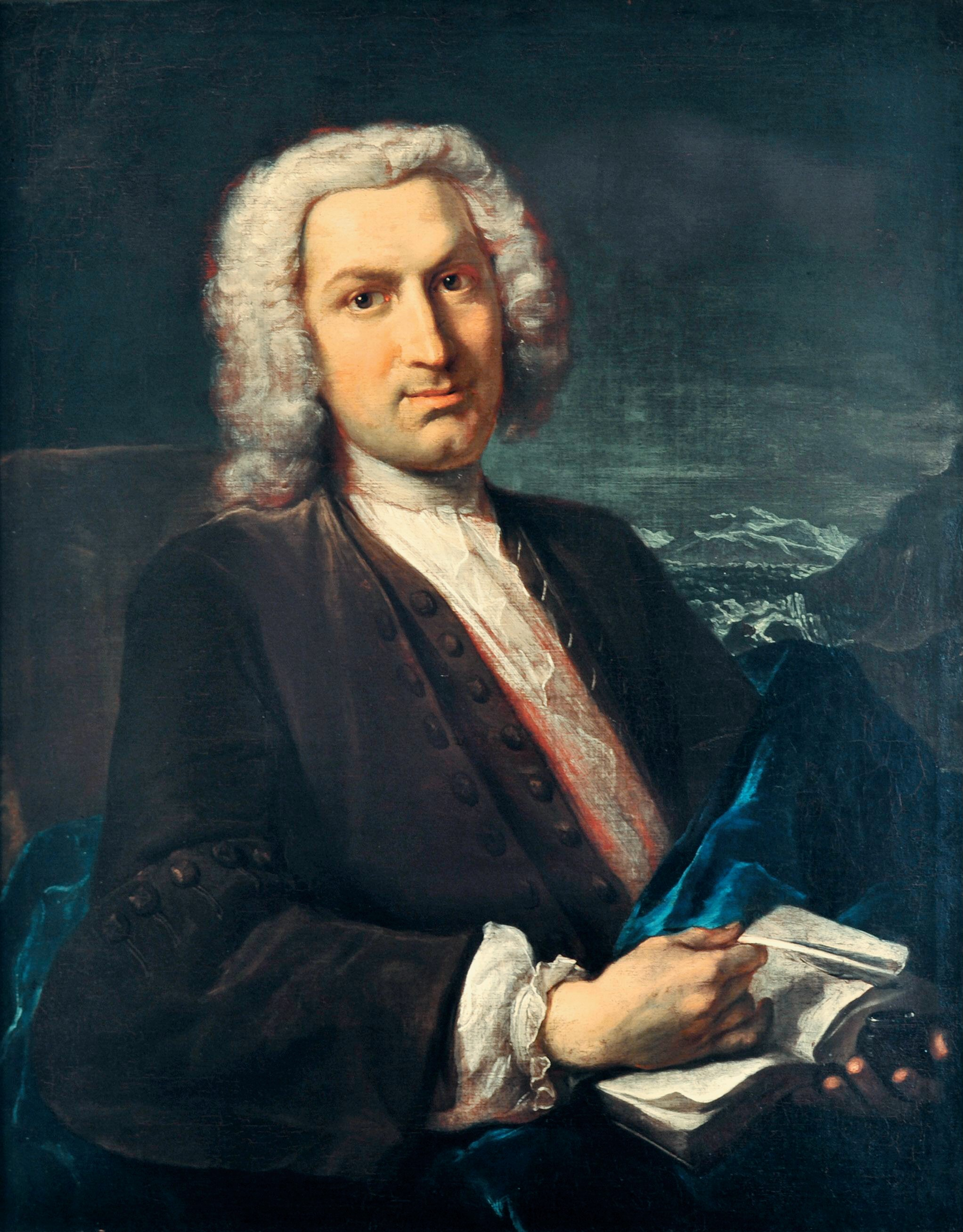
Albrecht von Haller, 1736

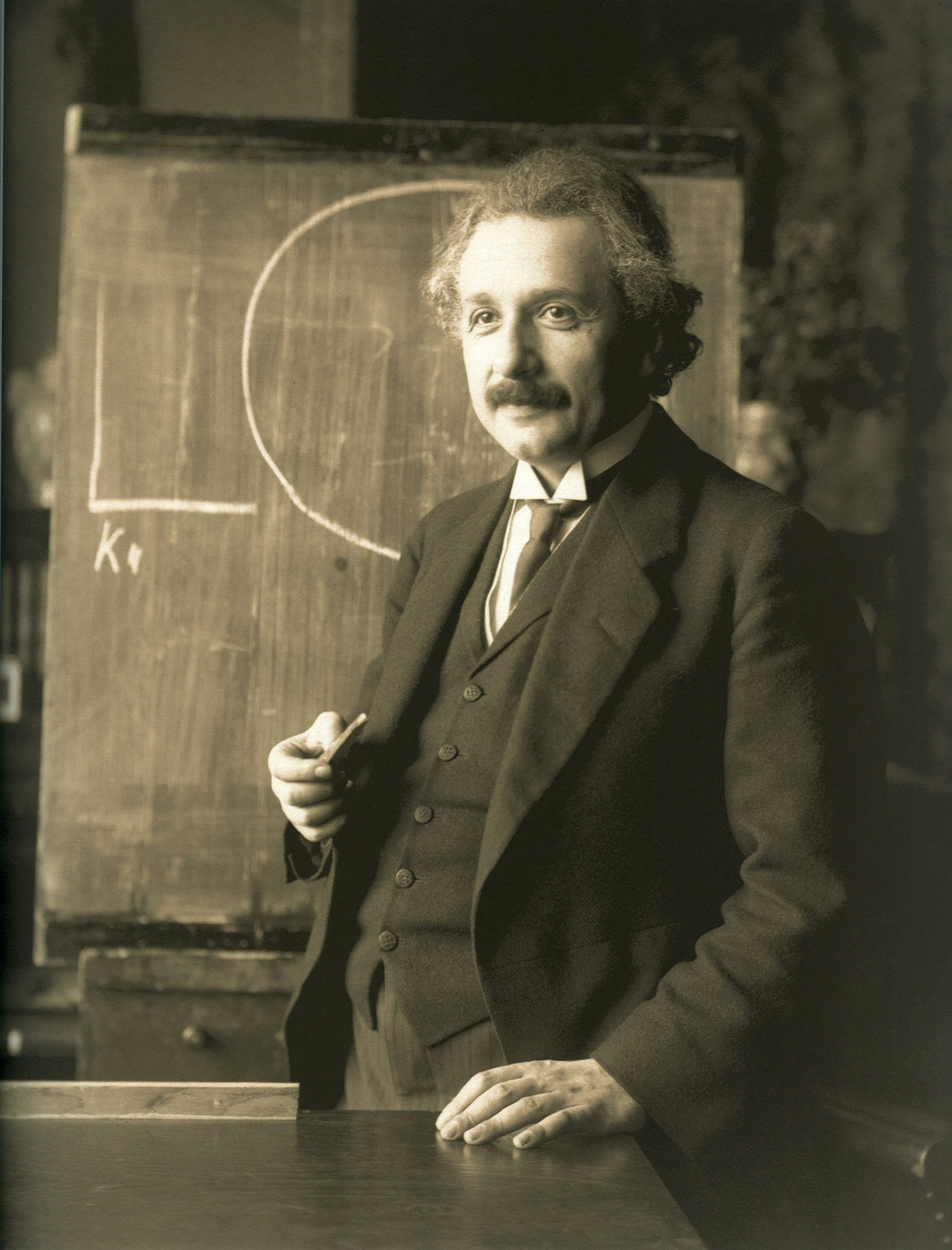
Albert Einstein, 1921

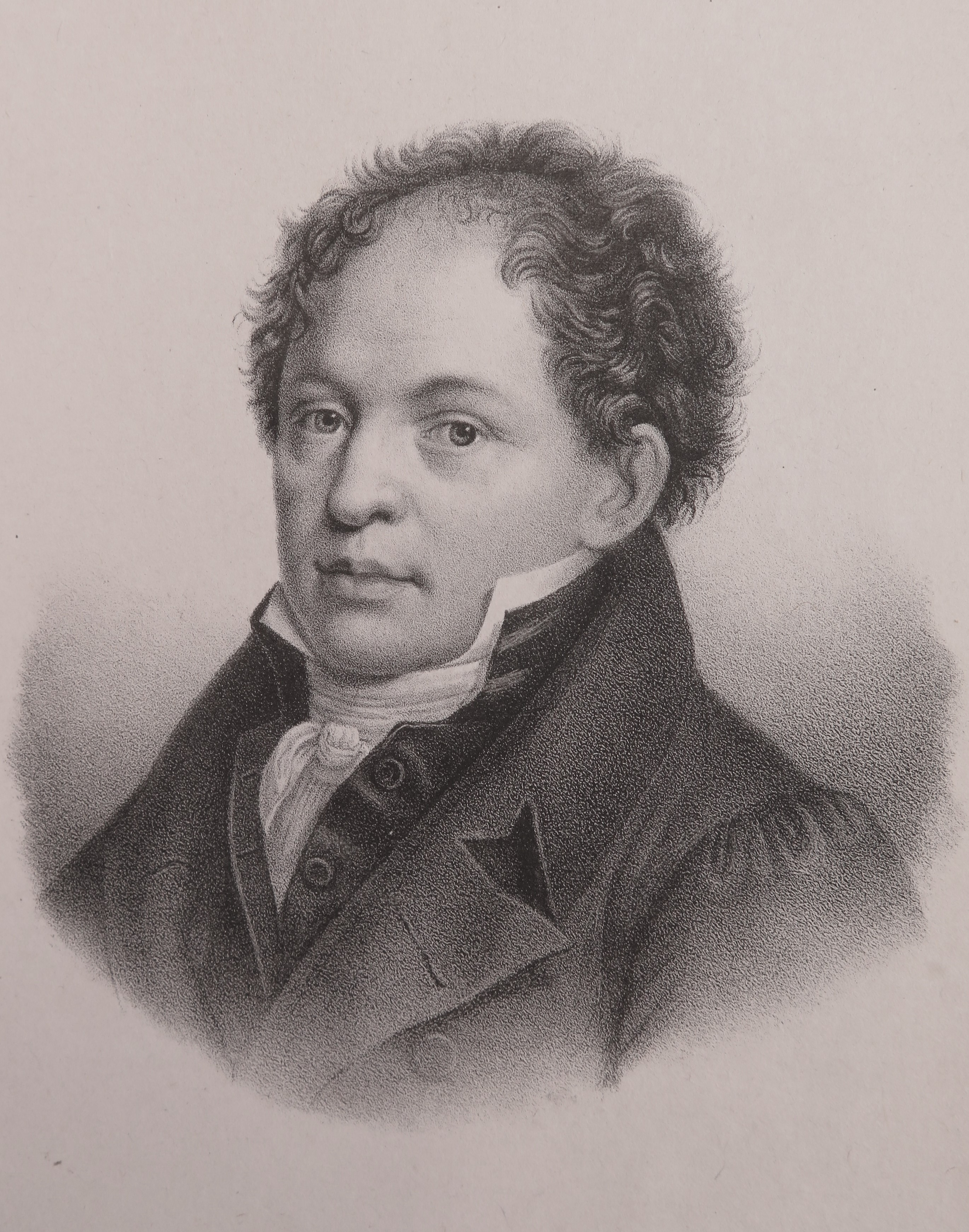
Johann Rudolf Wyss

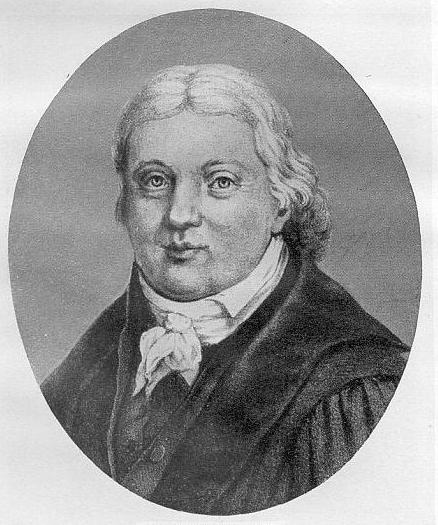
Daniel Albert Wyttenbach

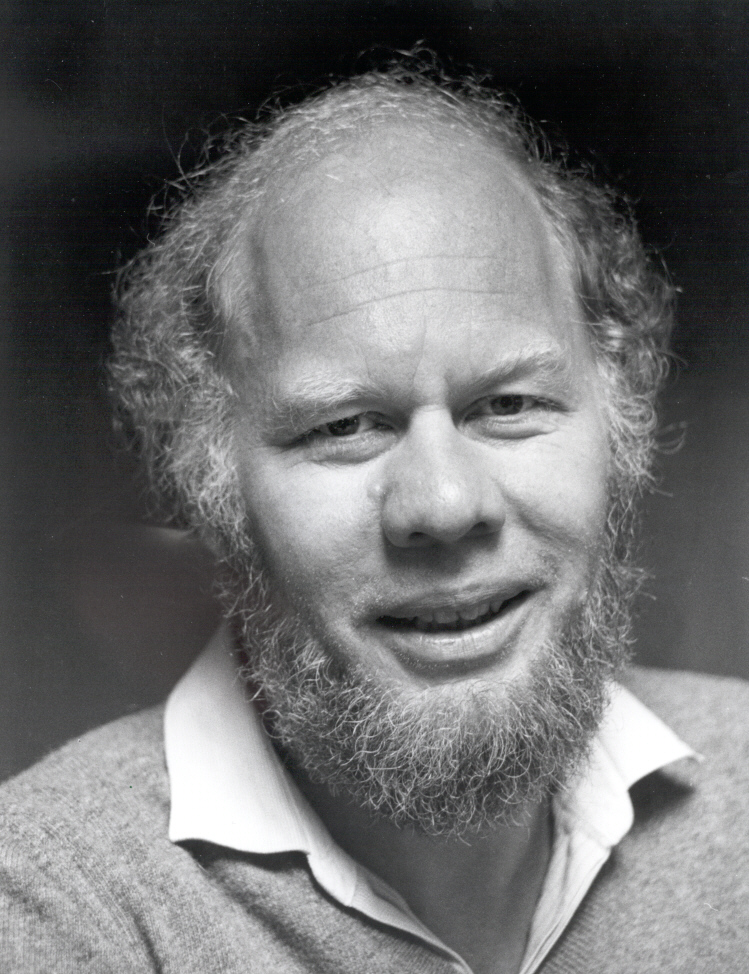
Lukas Hartmann, 1985

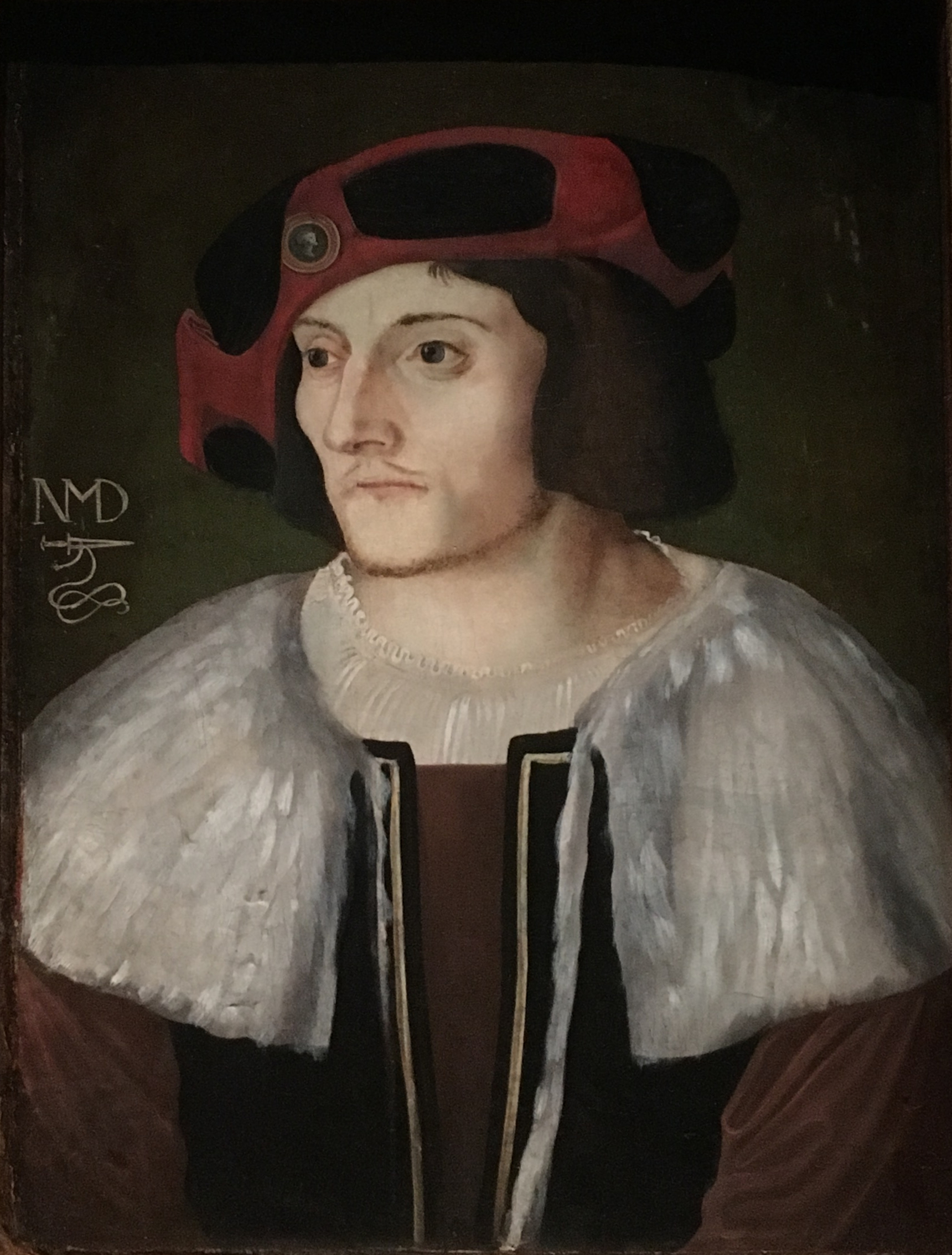
Niklaus Manuel, 1530

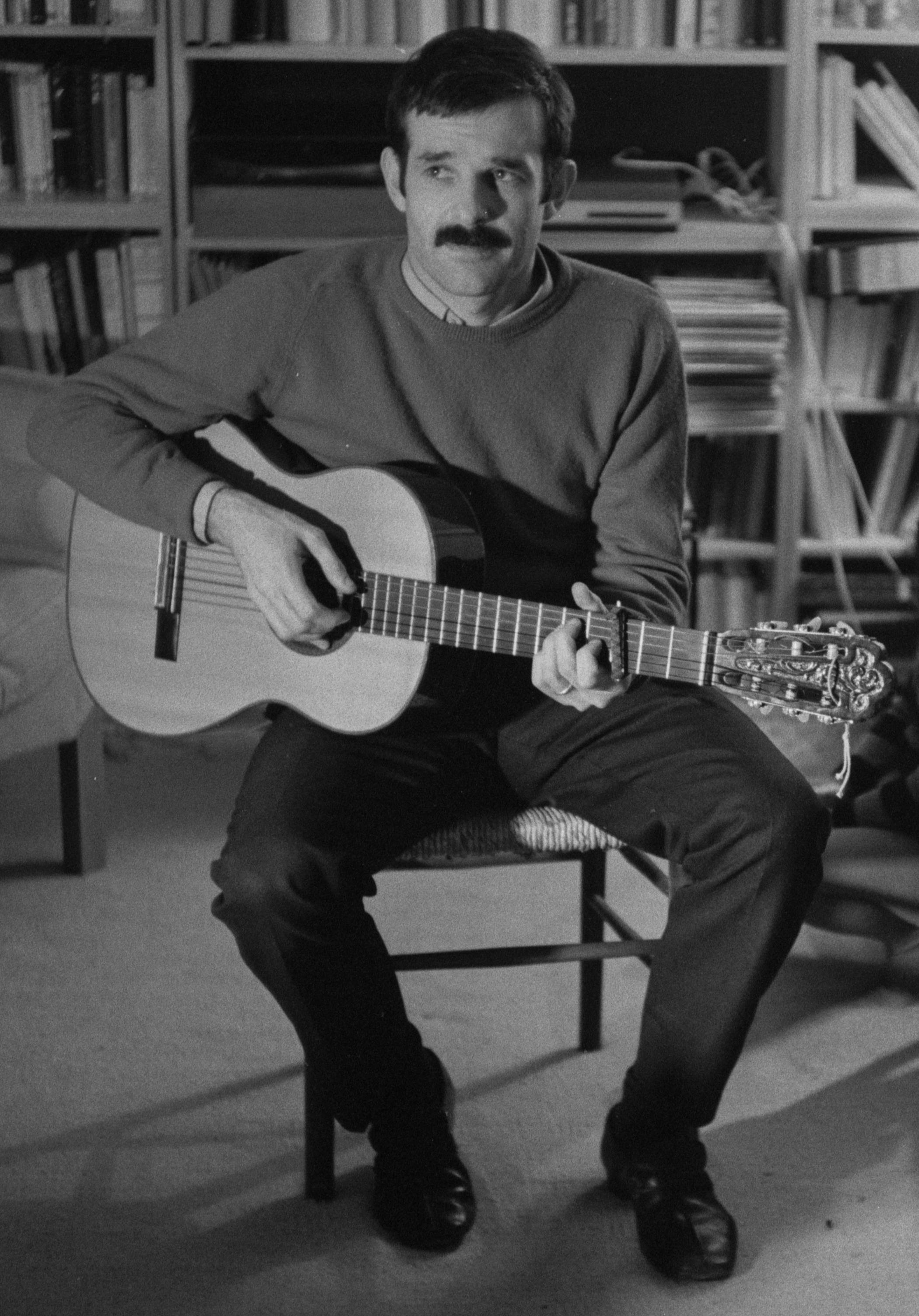
Mani Matter, 1970

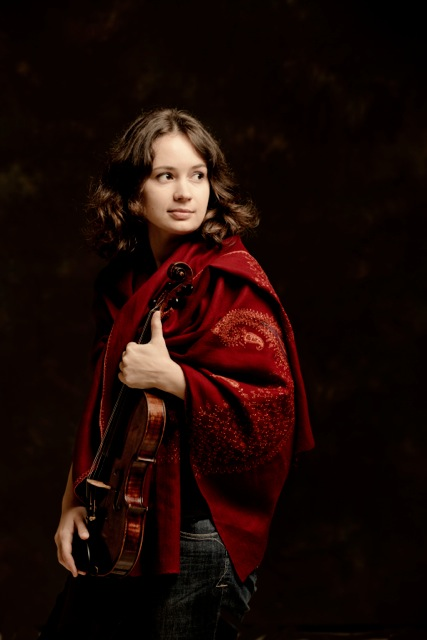
Patricia Kopatchinskaja, 2012

=== Public servants, the military and the church ===
- Conrad Justinger (c. 1360–1438) – chronicler, magistrate and notary public of the city of Bern
- Johann Jakob Grynaeus (1540–1617) – Protestant divine, a theologian of the school of Huldrych Zwingli
- Robert Scipio, Freiherr von Lentulus (1714–1786) – military officer, in Austrian and later, Prussian service
- Emmanuel Han (1801–1867) – military officer and philhellene, fought in the Greek War of Independence
- Walter Breisky (1871–1944) – Austrian jurist, civil servant and politician
- Rosalie Dreyer (1895–1987) – naturalized British nurse, pioneer in Britain's public-funded nursing service
- August R. Lindt (1905–2000) – lawyer and diplomat, Chairman of UNICEF 1953–1954 and UN High Commissioner for Refugees 1956–1960
- Marc Hodler (1918–2006) – lawyer, President of the International Ski Federation 1951–1998, exposed the 2002 Winter Olympic bid scandal
- Hans Urwyler (1925–1994) – Christian minister of the New Apostolic Church
- Kofi Annan (1938–2018 in Bern) – UN Secretary-General 1997–2006
- Algirdas Paleckis (born 1971) – Lithuanian diplomat, politician and columnist

=== Politicians and the landed gentry ===
- Adrian von Bubenberg (c. 1434–1479) – Bernese knight, military commander and 3-time mayor (Schultheiss) of Bern, hero of the Battle of Murten
- Niklaus Dachselhofer (1595–1670) – Bernese politician, Schultheiss (mayor) of Bern 1636–1667
- Christoph von Graffenried, 1st Baron of Bernberg (1661–1743) – founder of New Bern, North Carolina
- Susanna Julie von Bondeli (1731–1778) – salonist and lady of letters, the salon became the centre of intellectual life in Bern.
- Grand Duchess Anna Feodorovna of Russia (1781 – Elfenau, near Bern 1860) – German princess of the ducal house of Saxe-Coburg-Saalfeld
- Mikhail Bakunin (1814– 1876 in Bern) – Russian revolutionary anarchist.
- Karl Schenk (1823–1895) – pastor, politician; served on the Swiss Federal Council 1863–1895
- Vladimir Lenin (1870–1924) – lived in Bern 1914–1917
- Louise Elisabeth de Meuron (1882–1980) – aristocrat and eccentric personality in Bern
- Dom Duarte Pio, Duke of Braganza (born 1945) – claimant to the defunct Portuguese throne, as the head of the House of Braganza
- Regula Rytz (born 1962) – politician, sociologist and historian
- Ursula Wyss (born 1973) – economist and politician
- Min Li Marti (born 1974) – politician, publisher, sociologist and historian

=== Science and academia ===
- Albrecht von Haller (1708–1777) – anatomist, physiologist, naturalist, bibliographer and poet
- Carl Adolf Otth (1803–1839) – naturalist
- Gustav Heinrich Otth (1806–1874) – mycologist
- Carl Brunner von Wattenwyl (1823–1914) – entomologist who specialised in Orthoptera
- Ludwig Fischer (1828–1907) – botanist, researched phanerogams and cryptogams
- Adolph Francis Alphonse Bandelier (1840–1914) – American archaeologist.
- Emil Theodor Kocher (1841–1917) – physician and medical researcher, received the 1909 Nobel Prize in Physiology or Medicine for work on the thyroid
- Arnold Klebs (1870–1943) – physician who specialized in the study of tuberculosis
- Anna Tumarkin (1875–1951) – Russian-born, naturalized Swiss academic, the first woman to become a professor of philosophy at the University of Bern
- Albert Einstein (1879–1955) – worked out his theory of relativity while living in Bern, employed as a patent examiner at the patent office
- Ida Hoff (1880–1952) – pioneering doctor, feminist activist, early regular female motorist
- Aimé Félix Tschiffely (1895–1954) – Swiss-born, Argentine professor, writer and equestrian adventurer
- Hans Albert Einstein (1904–1973) – Swiss-American engineer and educator, the second child and first son of Albert Einstein
- Friedrich Tinner (born 1937) – nuclear engineer connected with the proliferation of nuclear materials in Iran, Libya, and North Korea
- Claudia Rosiny (born 1960) – German-Swiss academic in Dance and Media studies, a festival director and cultural manager
- Daniel Mojon (born 1963) – ophthalmologist and ophthalmic surgeon, invented minimally-invasive strabismus surgery
- Peter Jüni (born c. 1975) – scientific director of the Ontario COVID-19 Science Advisory Table, works at St. Michael's Hospital (Toronto)

=== Writing and acting ===
- Ulrich Boner or Bonerius (early 14th century) – German-speaking Swiss writer of fable
- Hans von Rüte (died 1558) – Bernese dramatist and chronicler of the Swiss Reformation
- Johann David Wyss (1743–1818) – author, best remembered for The Swiss Family Robinson
- Charles Victor de Bonstetten (1745–1832) – liberal writer
- Daniel Albert Wyttenbach (1746–1820) – German Swiss classical scholar
- Johann Rudolf Wyss (1782–1830) – author, writer, and folklorist who wrote the words to the former Swiss national anthem
- Charles Monnard (1790–1865) – historian and member of the Helvetic Society
- Vincent O. Carter (1924–1983) – American writer, author of The Bern Book
- Selma Urfer (1928–2013) – author, translator and actress
- Liselotte Pulver (born 1929) – actress, well known for her hearty and joyful laughter
- Bigna Francis-von Wyttenbach (1930–2021) – Swiss writer
- Yves Rénier (1942–2021) – French actor, director, screenwriter and voice actor
- Lukas Hartmann (born 1944) – children's writer, Switzerland's "first husband" in 2015
- Yang Lian (born 1955) – Swiss-Chinese poet associated with the Misty Poets
- Sibylle Canonica (born 1957) – actress, has appeared in more than forty films since 1981
- Georges Delnon (born 1958) – theatre director, artistic director and professor
- Sabine Timoteo (born 1975) – actress
- Yangzom Brauen (born 1980) – actress, activist and writer
- Cleo von Adelsheim (born 1987) – German-Chilean actress

=== Artists, painters and musicians ===
- Niklaus Manuel Deutsch (c. 1484–1530) – artist, writer, mercenary and Reformed politician
- Albrecht Kauw (1621–1681) – still-life painter, cartographer and a painter of vedute
- Gabriel Lory the Elder (1763–1840) – Bernese landscape painter and illustrator
- Ferdinand Hodler (1853–1918) – painter of portraits, landscapes and genre paintings
- Lisa Wenger (1858–1941) – painter and author of children's books
- Adolf Wölfli (1864–1930) – artist associated with Art brut
- Bertha Züricher (1869–1949) – author, painter and engraver
- Volkmar Andreae (1879–1962) – conductor and composer
- Eric Blom CBE (1888–1959) – British-naturalised music lexicographer, musicologist, music critic and music biographer
- Klaus Huber (1924–2017) – composer and academic
- Margrit Zimmermann (1927–2020) – pianist, composer, conductor and music educator
- Mani Matter (1936–1972) – singer-songwriter
- Roland Zoss (born 1951) – songwriter and novelist, lives on the Aeolian Islands
- Christine Lauterburg (born 1956) – singer, yodeler and actress
- Patricia Kopatchinskaja (born 1977) – Moldovan-Austrian-Swiss violinist
- Zora Slokar, (born 1980) horn player with Orchestra della Svizzera Italiana
- Giuseppe Bausilio (born 1997) – actor, dancer, and singer

=== Business ===
- Johann Rudolf Tschiffeli (1716–1780) – agronomist, a wealthy merchant, economist, and lawyer
- Franz Rudolf Frisching (1733–1807) – Bernese patrician, officer, politician, founded the Frisching Faience Manufactory
- Rodolphe Lindt (1855–1909) – chocolate manufacturer, founded the Lindt chocolate factory
- Marianne Alvoni (born 1964) – fashion designer

=== Sport ===
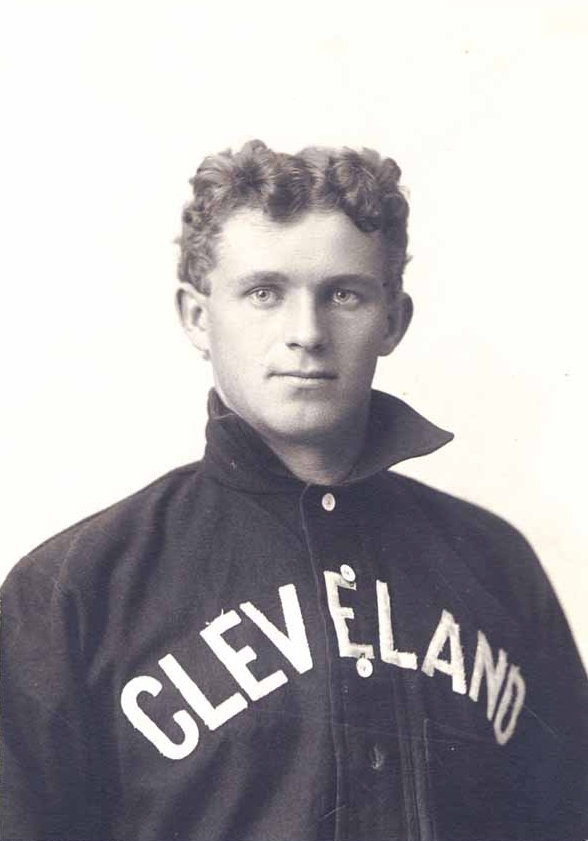
Otto Hess, c. 1906

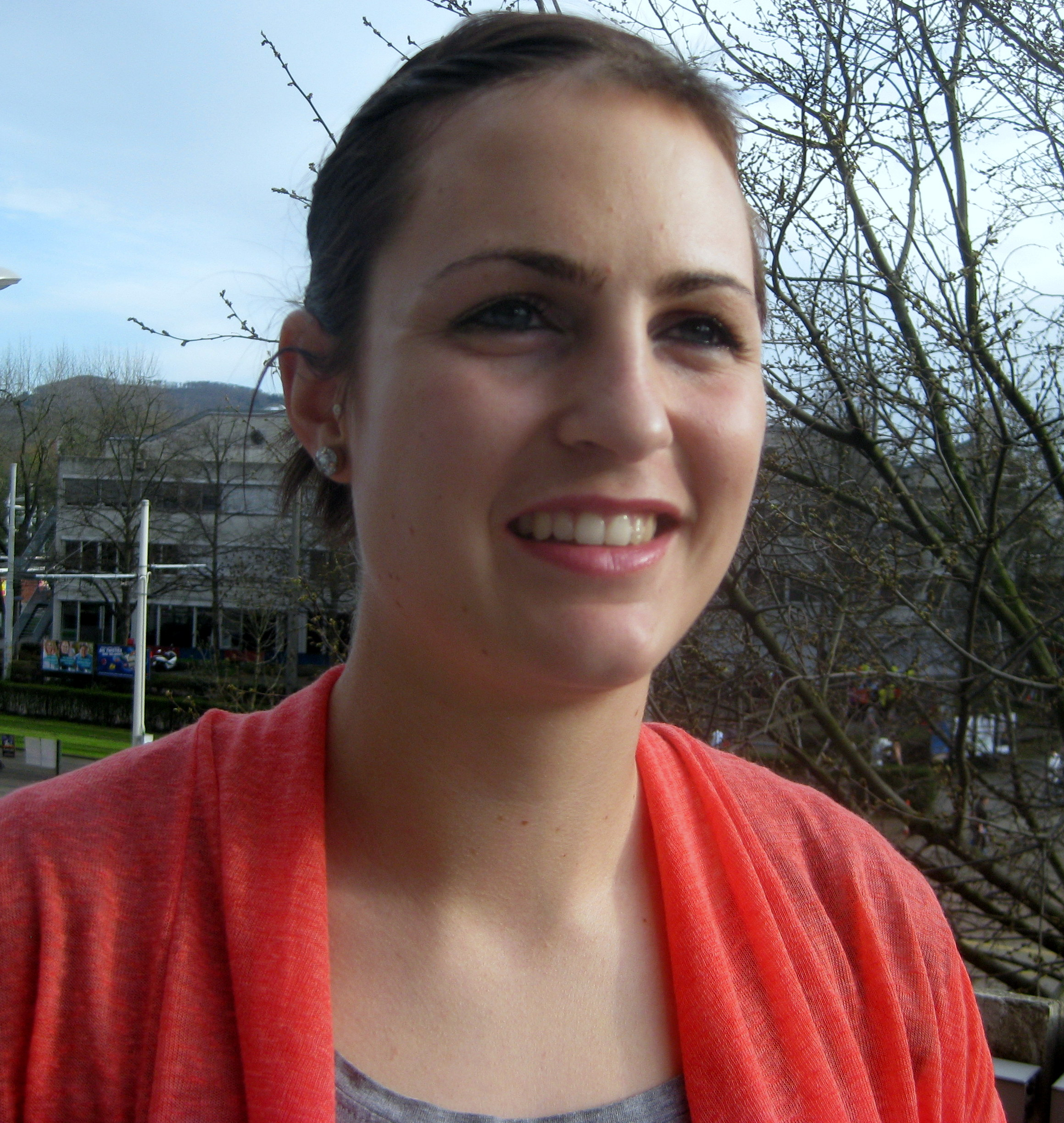
Jennifer Oehrli, 2013

- Elia Alessandrini (1997–2022), footballer, prospect player for the Switzerland national football team, died from drowning in Oman
- Philippe Marie Eugène, Count d'Ursel (1920–2017), was a Swiss-born Belgian alpine skier and a member of the Ursel family, competed at the 1948 Winter Olympics
- Tanja Frieden (born 1976), snowboarder and gold medallist at the 2006 Winter Olympics
- Guerino Gottardi (born 1970), a retired Swiss-Italian footballer, almost 250 club caps
- Otto Hess (1878–1926), pitcher for the Cleveland Bronchos 1902 and 1904–08 and Boston Braves 1912–15
- Maurizio Jacobacci (born 1963), Italian-Swiss football manager and former player
- Roman Josi (born 1990), professional ice hockey player, selected to play for Switzerland at the 2010 Winter Olympics
- Arnold Käch (1914–1998), military officer, skier, ski official and writer
- Christian Kauter (born 1947), fencer, silver medallist in the team épée at the 1972 Summer Olympics and bronze medallist at the 1976 Summer Olympics
- Dominik Märki (born 1990), Swiss curler, living in Fayetteville, Arkansas, bronze medallist in the 2018 Winter Olympics
- Jürg Marmet (1927–2013), mountaineer, part of the first two-man Swiss team which climbed Mount Everest in 1956
- Benoît Musy (1917–1956), racing driver and motorcycle racer
- Maja Neuenschwander (born 1980), long-distance runner who competes in marathon races
- Jennifer Oehrli (born 1989), football goalkeeper, member of the Switzerland women's national football team
- Mirjam Ott (born 1972), retired curler, captain of the Swiss Olympic Curling Team
- Kris Richard (born 1994), racing driver
- Markus Ryffel (born 1955), former long-distance runner, silver medallist in the 5000 metres at the 1984 Summer Olympics
- Akira Schmid (born 2000), professional ice hockey goaltender with the New Jersey Devils of the National Hockey League
- Ernst Schmied (1924–2002), mountaineer, the second successful summiteer of Mount Everest in 1956
- Esther Staubli (born 1979), football referee, on the FIFA International Referees List since 2006
- Willi Steffen (1925–2005), former fighter pilot and international footballer, won 28 caps for his country
- Christine Stückelberger (born 1947), retired equestrian, gold medallist in dressage at the 1976 Summer Olympics compete at six Olympics: 1972, 1976, 1984, 1988, 1996 and 2000.
- Alain Sutter (born 1968), footballer, 351 club caps, 58 national team caps

== See also ==
- Municipalities of the canton of Bern
- Tourism in Switzerland
