= Kramgasse =

Street in Bern, Switzerland

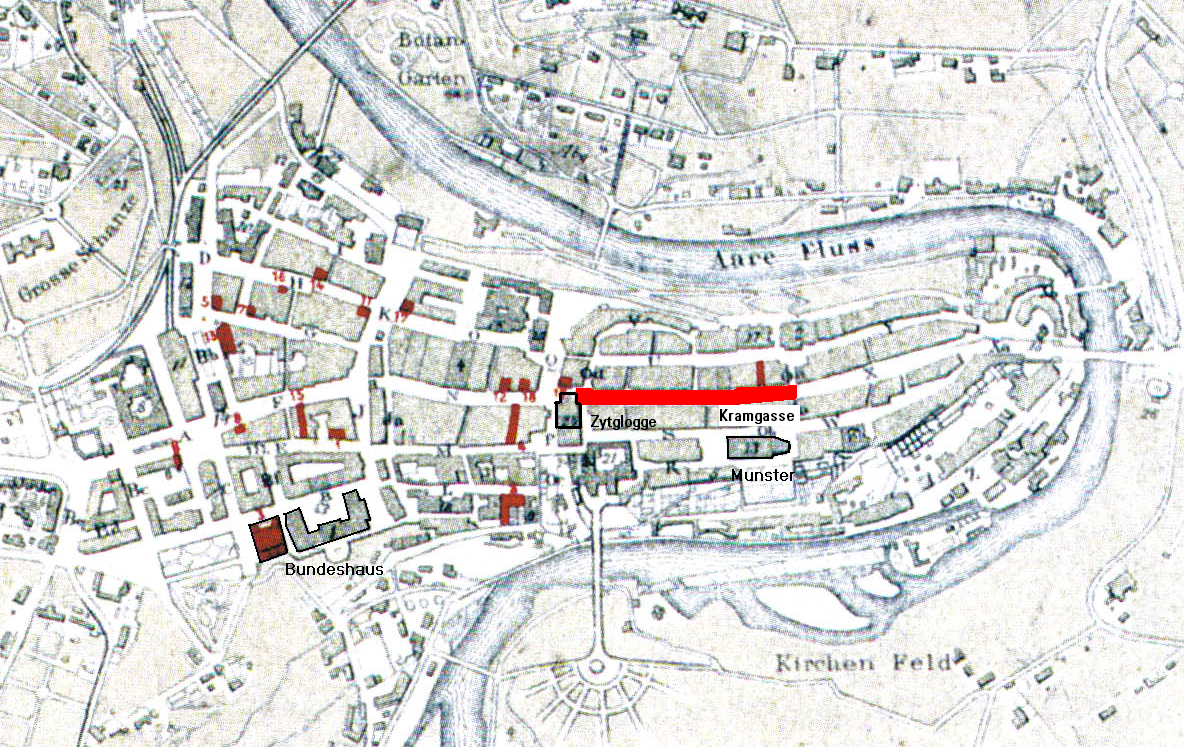
- Old City of Bern with Kramgasse highlighted
- Former name(s): Märitgasse; Vordere Gasse
- Length: 330 m (1,080 ft)
- Location: Old City of Bern, Bern, Switzerland
- Postal code: 3011
- Coordinates: 46.947972°N 7.450278°E

Construction
- Construction start: 1191

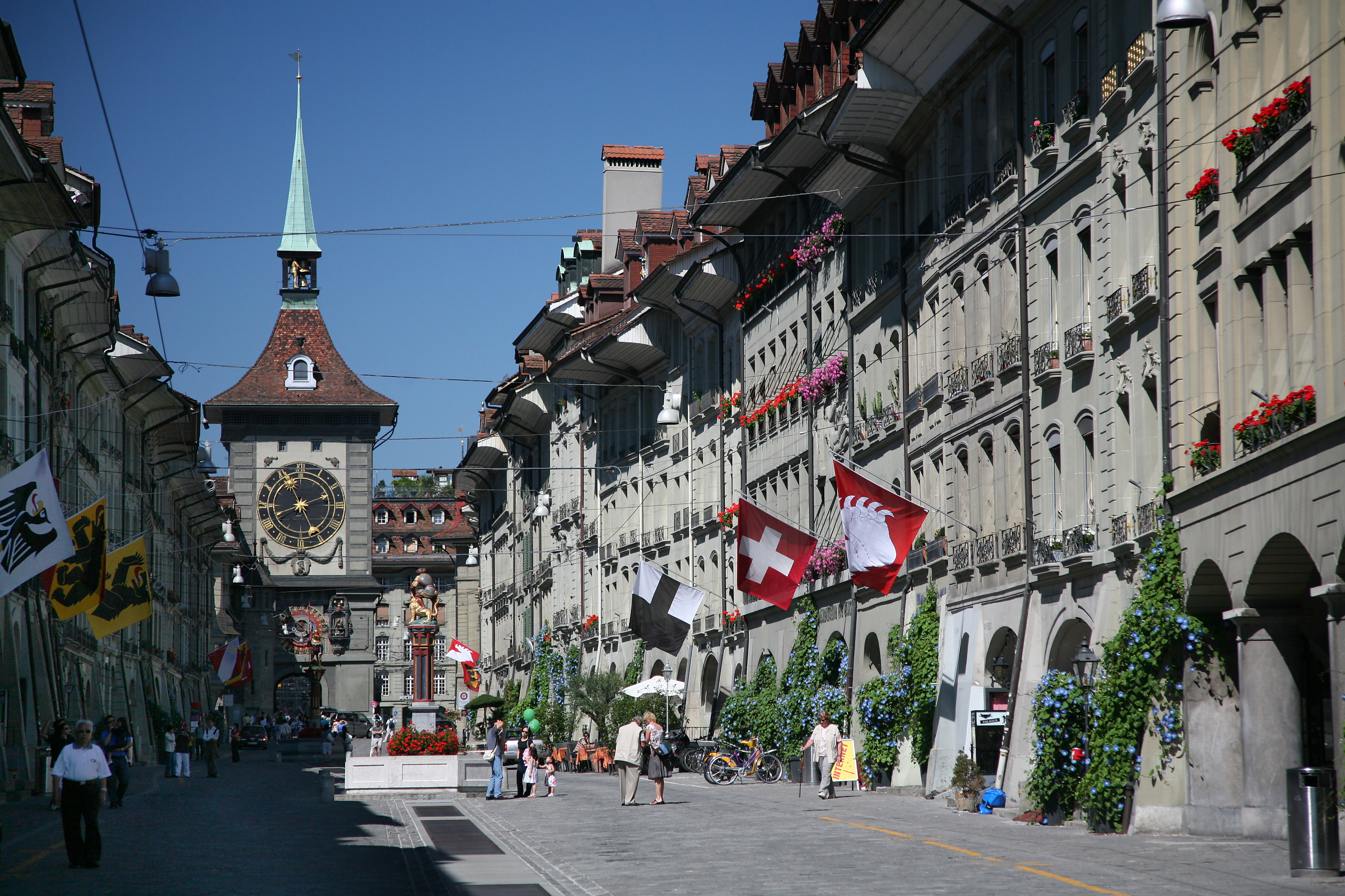
The eastern half of the Kramgasse, looking toward the Zytglogge and the Simsonbrunnen.

The Kramgasse ("Grocers Alley") is one of the principal streets in the Old City of Bern, the medieval city centre of Bern, Switzerland. It was the center of urban life in Bern until the 19th century. Today, it is a popular shopping street. Its length, slight curve and long line of Baroque façades combine to produce Bern's most impressive streetscape.

The Kramgasse and its buildings are a heritage site of national significance and part of the UNESCO Cultural World Heritage Site that encompasses the Old City.

== Topography ==
The Kramgasse is some 330 meters (1,080 ft) long and lies at the center of the old city. It is the western half of the central axis of the city's oldest part, the Zähringerstadt, built right after the founding of the city in 1191. It is bounded to the west by the Zytglogge, Bern's iconic clock tower that served as the city's main gate tower in the 12th century. In the east, the Kreuzgasse, literally a "crossroads", separates it from the other half of the old main street, the Gerechtigkeitsgasse. Several narrow alleys and passageways connect the Kramgasse to the parallel Rathausgasse in the north and the Münstergasse in the south.

The Kramgasse cannot be reached by car without a special permit. It is accessible by foot, bike or by means of the Bernmobil bus line no. 12 that runs through it and has stops at either end of the street (Zytglogge and Rathaus). Both sides of the Kramgasse are covered with Lauben, stone arcades that protect pedestrians from inclement weather.

== History ==
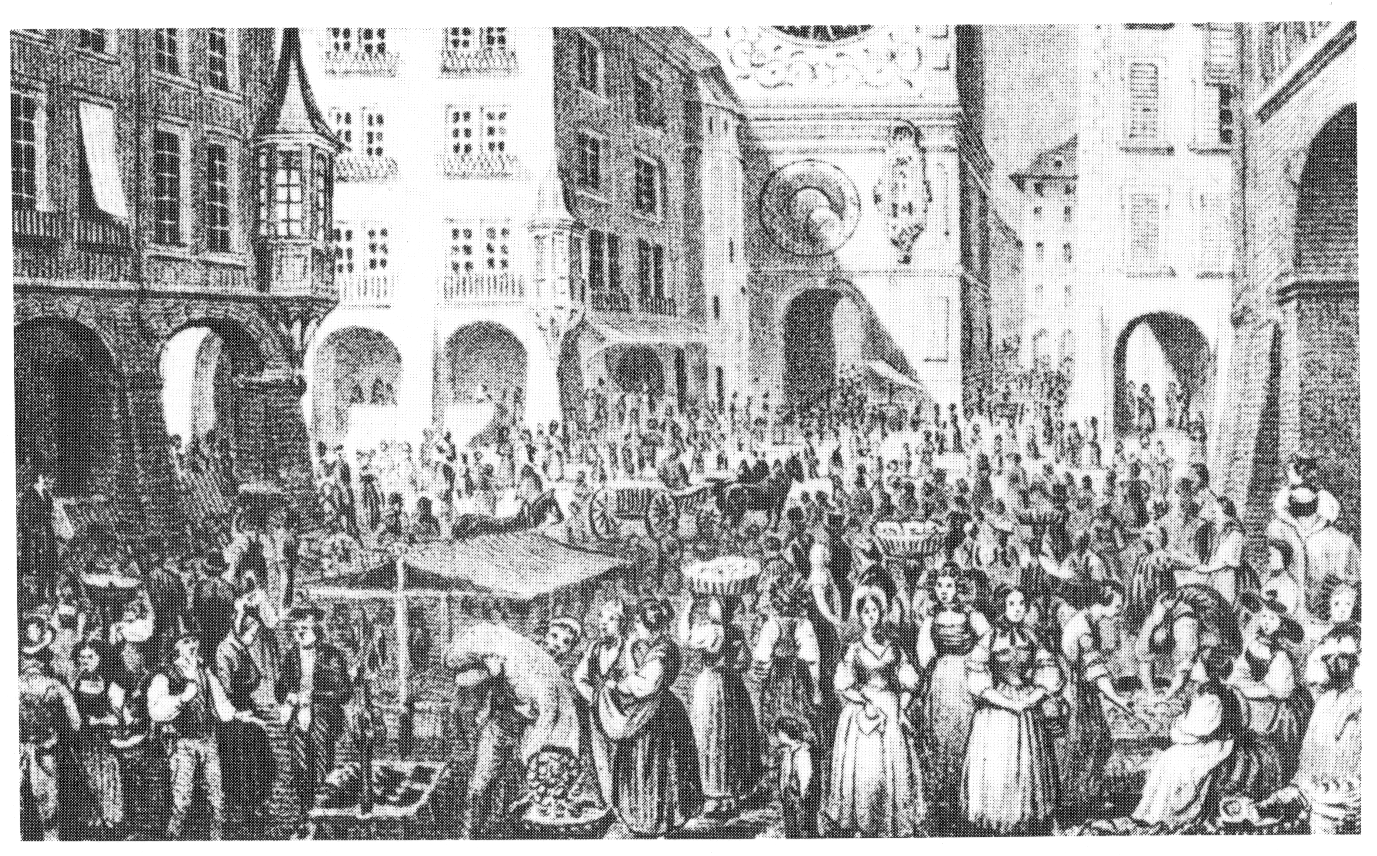
A 19th century market day in the Kramgasse.

The Kramgasse was known as the Märitgasse (Swiss German for "Market Alley") until the 15th century and as the Vordere Gasse during the 16th century. The changes in name reflect the street's changes in character. In medieval times, it served as the city's marketplace, but after the Reformation the market stands were gradually replaced by stores. The street remained the commercial center of the city until the middle of the 19th century, its heyday being the 1840s.

Over the centuries, the street was slowly gentrified. Throughout the 19th century, residents complained about the waste, smell and noise associated with the Schaal, an open hall of butcher's stalls vis-à-vis the Simsonbrunnen. The Schaal was eventually demolished in 1938 and a conservatory built in its place, disrupting the medieval streetscape. Local legend has it that a calf once flayed alive here still haunts the place of its death with frightful bleats.

In the second half of the 19th century, the commercial significance of the Kramgasse waned as business moved to the newer, western part of the city and the authorities shut down the many noisy cellar taverns. At the turn of the 20th century, the Kramgasse was already a tourist attraction. Beginning in the 1920s, buses and tramways were routed through it, and from the 1970s on, motor traffic was gradually prohibited throughout the lower Old City. The number of apartments on the Kramgasse steadily dwindled as they came to be replaced by shops and offices. In 2005, the street was thoroughly renovated and its cobblestone pavement replaced. The city ditch (Stadtbach) running through the middle of the street since medieval times is now visible again through metal gratings.

== Buildings ==
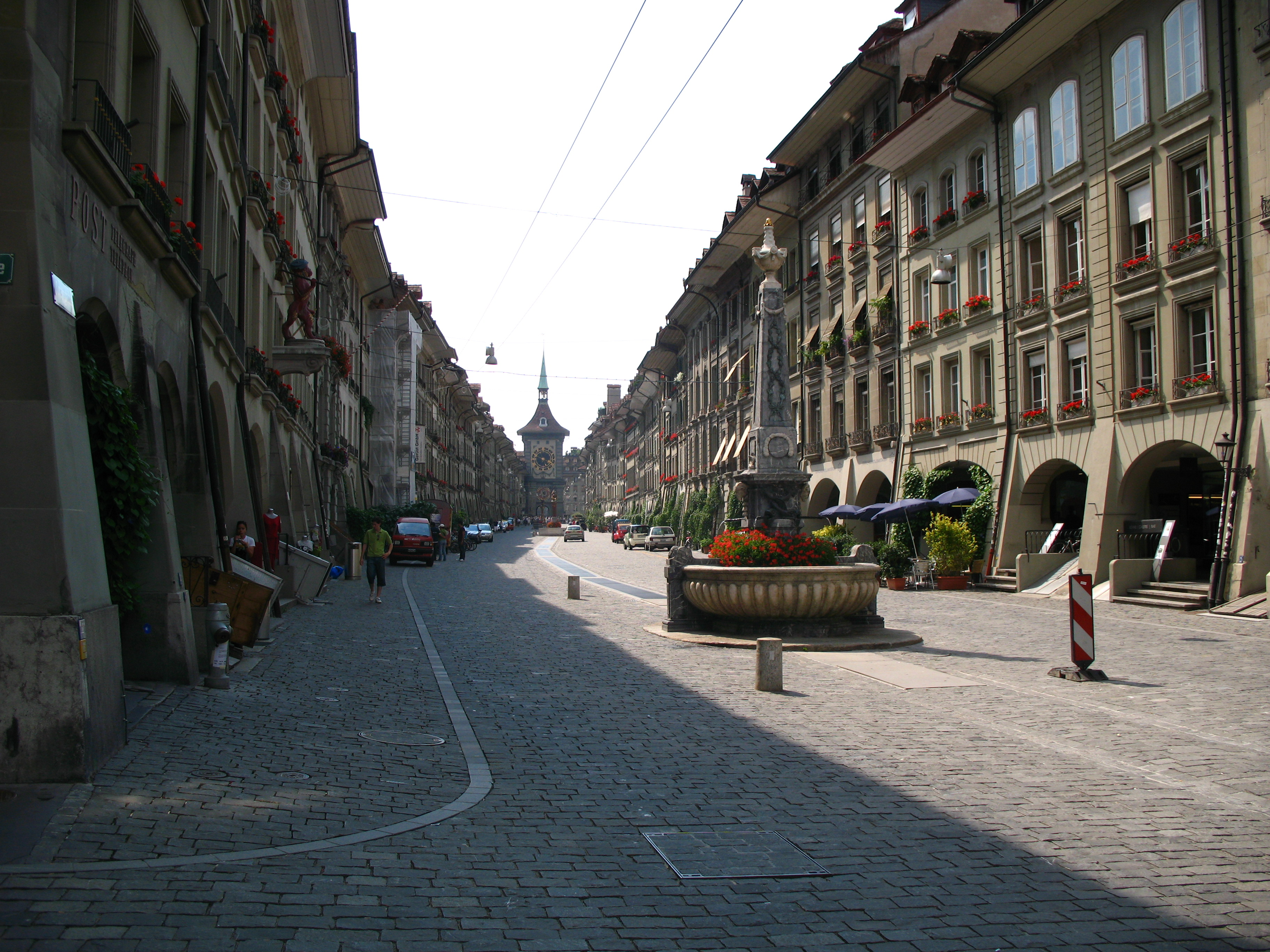
The Kreuzgassbrunnen and the full length of the Kramgasse, as seen from the Kreuzgasse.

Apart from a few cellars, only fragments of the current buildings on the Kramgasse date from before 1500. Many of the private town-houses retain elements from the Late Gothic period. There are very few preserved 17th century façades. Between 1705 and 1745, the façades and parts of the interior of 72 of the street's 85 buildings were rebuilt in the Baroque style, many of them by the noted architect Albrecht Stürler or his students.

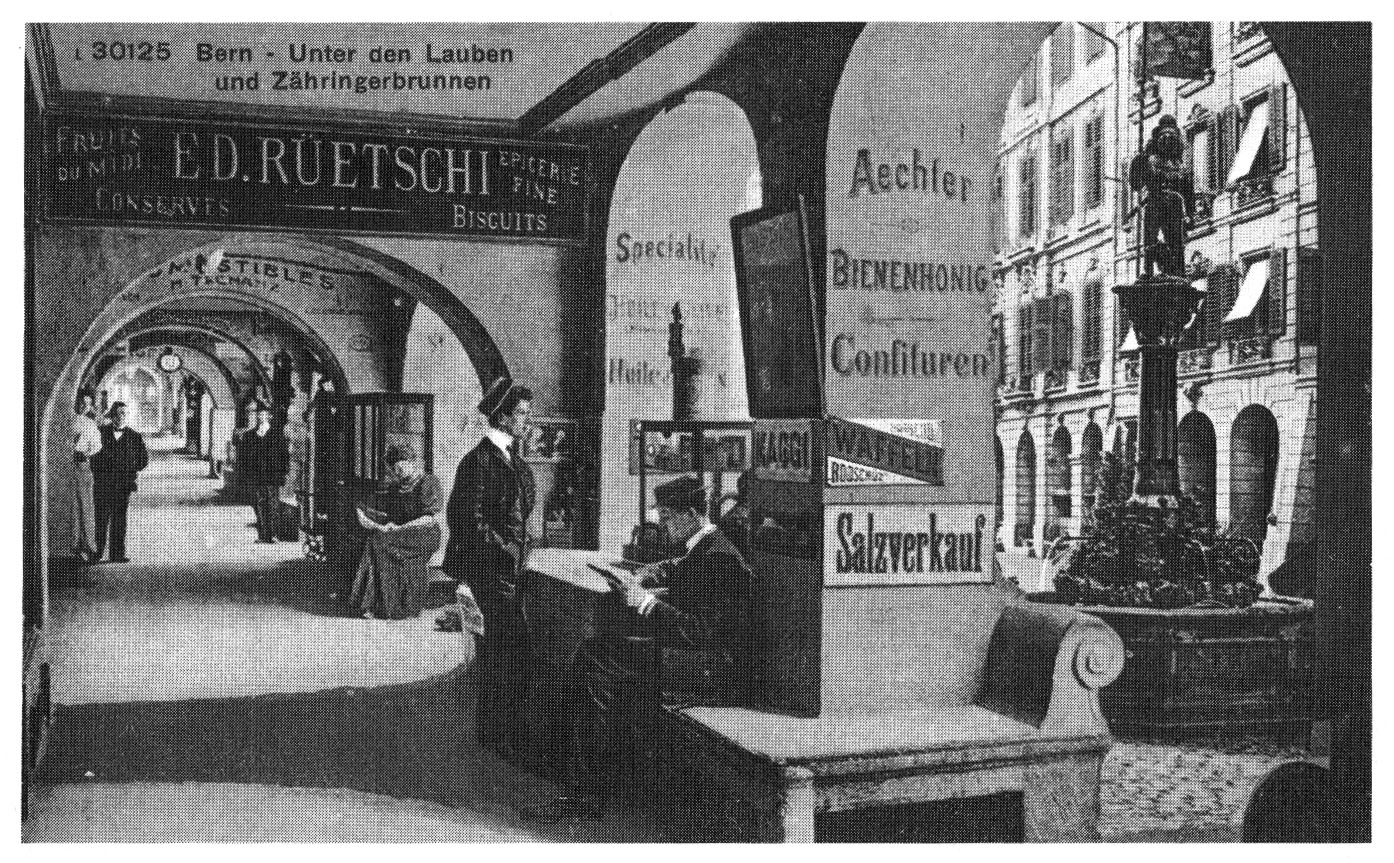
The Lauben on the Kramgasse and the Zähringerbrunnen. Postcard from around 1900.

Three fountains decorate the street. At the eastern crossroads, the Kreuzgassbrunnen was the model for all other obelisk fountains of Bern; it was built 1778–79 by Christian Reist and Johann Conrad Wiser. In the center, the Simsonbrunnen was built in 1527 and decorated with a figure by Hans Gieng of Samson taming the lion in 1543. The Zähringerbrunnen at the western end of the street is Bern's first figure-topped fountain, an interesting combination of historical tradition and heraldic personification. It was built by Hans Hiltprand in 1535, depicting an armoured bear – Bern's heraldic beast – bearing the arms of the house of Zähringen.

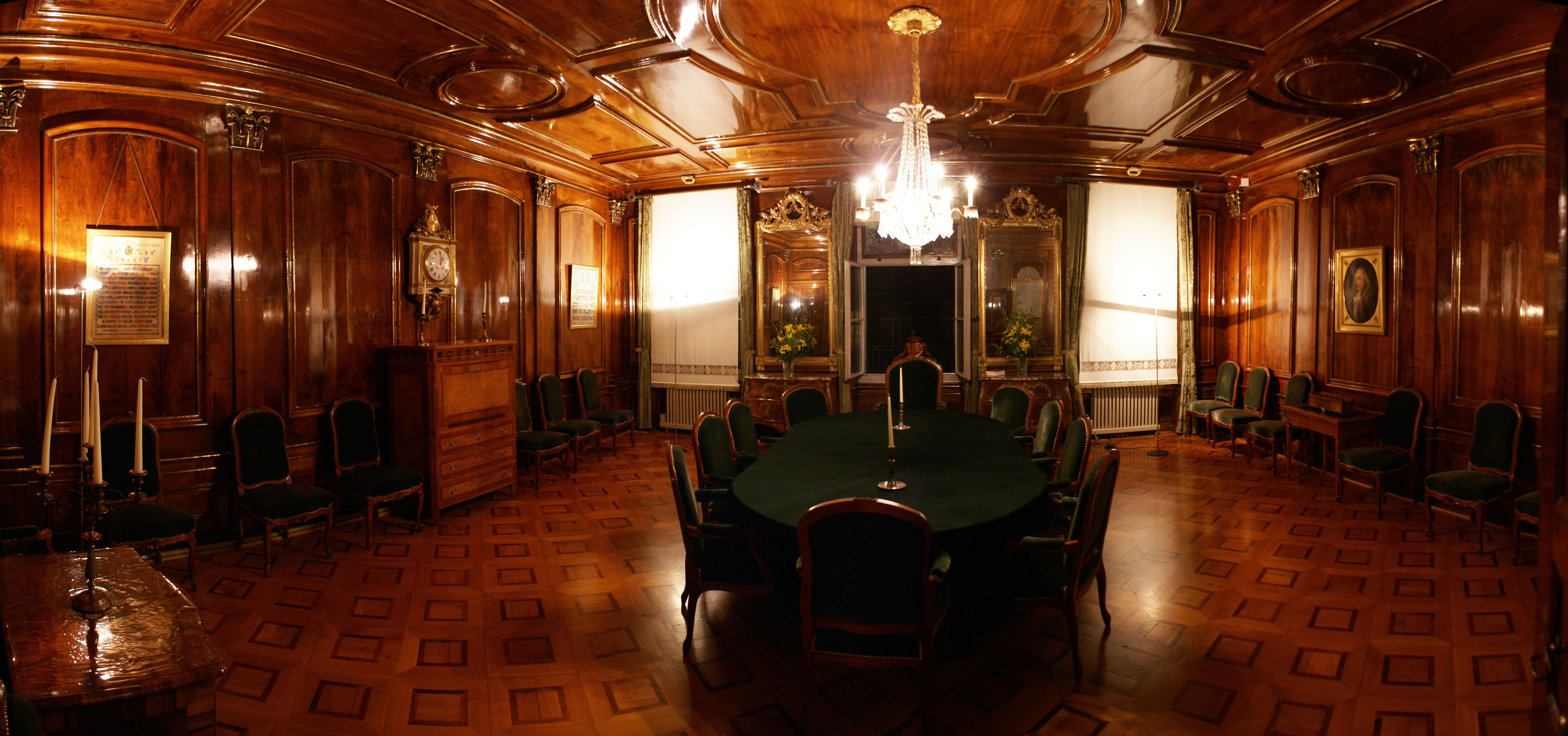
The guild hall in the Zunfthaus zu Kaufleuten.

House no. 2, at the eastern end of the street, houses Bern's oldest apothecary's since 1527; the 1824 hardwood interior of the drugstore is unique as the earliest witness of the Gothic Revival in Bern. The cellar of house no. 4 dates from the 13th century, Bern's oldest building period. House no. 7 is completely preserved in its state of 1559 and the city's most impressive ensemble of secular Late Gothic architecture; its rich interior is preserved in the Historical Museum. No. 19 was built together with no. 21 in 1735–40 and is representative of the Bernese Régence style; it was used as a family town house until the 1970s. No. 29, the Zunfthaus zu Kaufleuten ("Merchants' Guildhouse") is the most significant Late Baroque Bernese town house, built 1718–20 by Niklaus Schiltknecht and equipped with a guild hall with impressive Baroque boiseries and furniture. No. 17–21 are the headquarters of the police department of the canton of Bern, in the course of whose establishment here in the 1950s the historical interior was largely destroyed. No. 41 features one of the few Humanist house mottoes that survived the 18th-century building boom; it reads: "What's most beautiful is highest justice, what's best is to be healthy, but what's most joyful is to attain what one desires."

The Zunfthaus zu Metzgern ("Butchers' Guildhouse"), no. 45, is a 1769 construction by Rudolf Augst, a student of Niklaus Sprüngli. No. 61 features the first use of the colossal order in a private building in Bern; its back-house, Münstergasse no. 56, is one of the few purely pre-Baroque town houses. No. 54 is recognised as one of the finest works of Bernese town house architecture and as the best work of Albrecht Stürler. No. 81, in turn, has been characterised as a low-key masterpiece by Niklaus Sprüngli because of its tensely elegant, barely adorned façade.

== Famous residents ==
House no. 49, the Einsteinhaus, was the residence of Albert and Mileva Einstein from 1903 to 1905 and the place where Einstein wrote his Annus Mirabilis Papers. The house is now a small museum and memorial to the great physicist. Einstein's apartments were on the first floor, above the restaurant Zum untern Juker.

Albrecht von Haller, the Bernese naturalist, resided in no. 25 in the 1750s. Federal Councillor Max Petitpierre lived in no. 61 during his time in office. Other notable Bernese who lived on the Kramgasse include two Schultheisse, Niklaus Friedrich von Steiger and Karl Friedrich von Tscharner (in no. 61 and 74, respectively), illustrator Albert Lindegger (in no. 82 and 17) and art historian Wilhelm Stein (in no. 43).

== Amenities ==
The Kramgasse is one of Bern's more upmarket shopping streets. Among others, it features antiquaries, drugstores, bakeries, banks, jewelers' stores, bookstores, art galleries, boutiques, restaurants, furniture stores, opticians' stores, furriers, watch dealerships and wine cellars.

Bern's oldest cinema, the Capitol, is located on Kramgasse, as are a number of small theaters, mostly set up in the medieval cellars (Kellertheater).
