= Albert Einstein Society =

Scientific society in Switzerland

The Albert Einstein Society was founded by Dr. Max Flückiger on 28 June 1977. Based in Bern, Switzerland, the society awards the Einstein Medal to individuals who have made an outstanding contribution to science that relates to the work of Albert Einstein. The society also operates Einstein House in Bern as a museum, holds the annual Albert Einstein Lectures series, and publishes a newsletter.

== History ==
The society was founded in 1977, by Max Flückiger. It is based in Einstein House in Bern, which is where Einstein developed his theory of relativity in the Annus Mirabilis papers. The house was opened as a museum on 14 March 1979, to mark the hundredth anniversary of Einstein's birth. Flückiger is not a physicist but had written a biography of Einstein, focused on his years in Bern, which was published in 1974.

The society has a scientific board of trustees, members of which include president Philippe Jetzer, Matthias Blau, Camille Bonvin, Christoph Greub, Mikko Laine and Hans-Rudolf Ott. The board of trustees is responsible for submitting proposals for the awarding of the Einstein Medal.

== Activities ==
The society awards the Einstein Medal to individuals who have made an outstanding contribution to science that relates to the work of Albert Einstein. They operate the Einstein House as a museum, and run public lectures and publish a regular newsletter, Olympia. The society also advocated for the renaming of a street in Bern to commemorate Einstein.

=== Albert Einstein Lectures ===
Since 2009, the society has collaborated with the University of Bern to give an annual public lecture series, the Albert Einstein Lectures. The event involves three lectures held in a single week each year, delivered by one person. Recent lectures have been delivered by Susan R. Wolf (2024), who lectured on 'human selves', Maryna Viazovska (2023), who lectured on the mathematics of sphere packings, and Didier Queloz (2022), who lectured on exoplanets.
