= List of museums in Bern =

This is a list of museums in Bern, Switzerland.

== Fine arts ==
- Abegg Foundation (Abegg-Stiftung Riggisberg), Werner Abegg-Strasse 67, Riggisberg, 46.8154°N 7.495°E. Historic textiles and fabrics.
- Art Gallery Bern (Kunsthalle Bern), Helvetiaplatz 1, 46.9443°N 7.4494°E. Expositions of contemporary art.
- Kornhausforum, Kornhausplatz 18, 46.9488°N 7.4472°E. Expositions of contemporary art.
- Lichtspiel / Kinemathek Bern, Sandrainstrasse 3, 46.940106°N 7.441619°E. Cinema and movie history, projections of historic films.
- Museum of Fine Arts Berne (Kunstmuseum Bern), Hodlerstrasse 8–12, 46.9511°N 7.4434°E. Extensive collection of fine art from all periods.
- Zentrum Paul Klee, Monument im Fruchtland 3, 46.9493°N 7.4743°E. Contains almost half of Paul Klee's paintings.
- Museum Cerny. contemporary circumpolar art, Stadtbachstrasse 8a, 46.94923°N 7.43424°E. Extensive collections of contemporary circumpolar art.

== History ==
- Historical Museum of Bern (Historisches Museum Bern) and Einstein Museum, Helvetiaplatz 5, 46.9430°N 7.4493°E. General history of Bern and exhibition on the life and work of Albert Einstein.
- Salvation Army Museum, Headquarters of the Salvation Army, Laupenstrasse 5, 46.9471°N 7.4370°E. History of the Salvation Army.
- Swiss Rifle Museum (Schweizer Schützenmuseum), Bernastrasse 5, 46.9428°N 7.4485°E. Swiss rifles and Swiss shooting sports history.

== Science ==
- Einstein House (Einsteinhaus), Kramgasse 49, 46.9478°N 7.4499°E. Home of Albert Einstein.
- Museum of Communication Bern (Museum für Kommunikation), Helvetiastrasse 16, 46.9418°N 7.4500°E. History and technology of communication.
- Natural History Museum (Naturhistorisches Museum der Burgergemeinde Bern), Bernastrasse 15, 46.9421°N 7.4489°E. Natural history.
- Psychiatrie-Museum Bern, Waldau clinic, Bolligenstrasse 111, 46.9656°N 7.4806°E. History of psychiatry.

== Other ==
- Collection of Classical Antiquities (Antikensammlung Bern), Hallerstrasse 12, 46.9527°N 7.4352°E. Plaster casts of 230 classical sculptures.
- Käfigturm – Political Forum of the Confederation, Marktgasse 67, 46.9487°N 7.4439°E. Exhibitions on political topics.
- Swiss Alpine Museum (Schweizerisches Alpines Museum), Helvetiaplatz 4, 46.9441°N 7.4482°E. Nature and culture of the Swiss Alps.
- Swiss Theater Collection, Schanzenstrasse 15, 46.9495°N 7.4364°E. History of theater.
- Tram-Museum Bern, Seftigenstrasse 48, 46.9353°N 7.4328°E. Vintage tramways and autobuses, opens only on some Sundays.
- YB Museum in the Stade de Suisse, Papiermühlestrasse 77, 46.9630°N 7.4660°E. History of the BSC Young Boys football club.

== See also ==
- List of museums in Switzerland
