= Swiss Alpine Museum =

Museum in Bern, Switzerland

Coordinates: 46.9441°N 7.4482°E

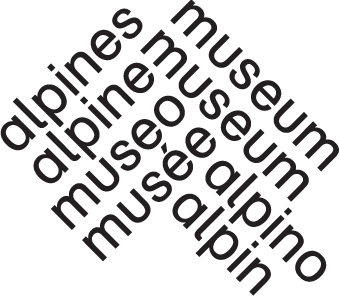

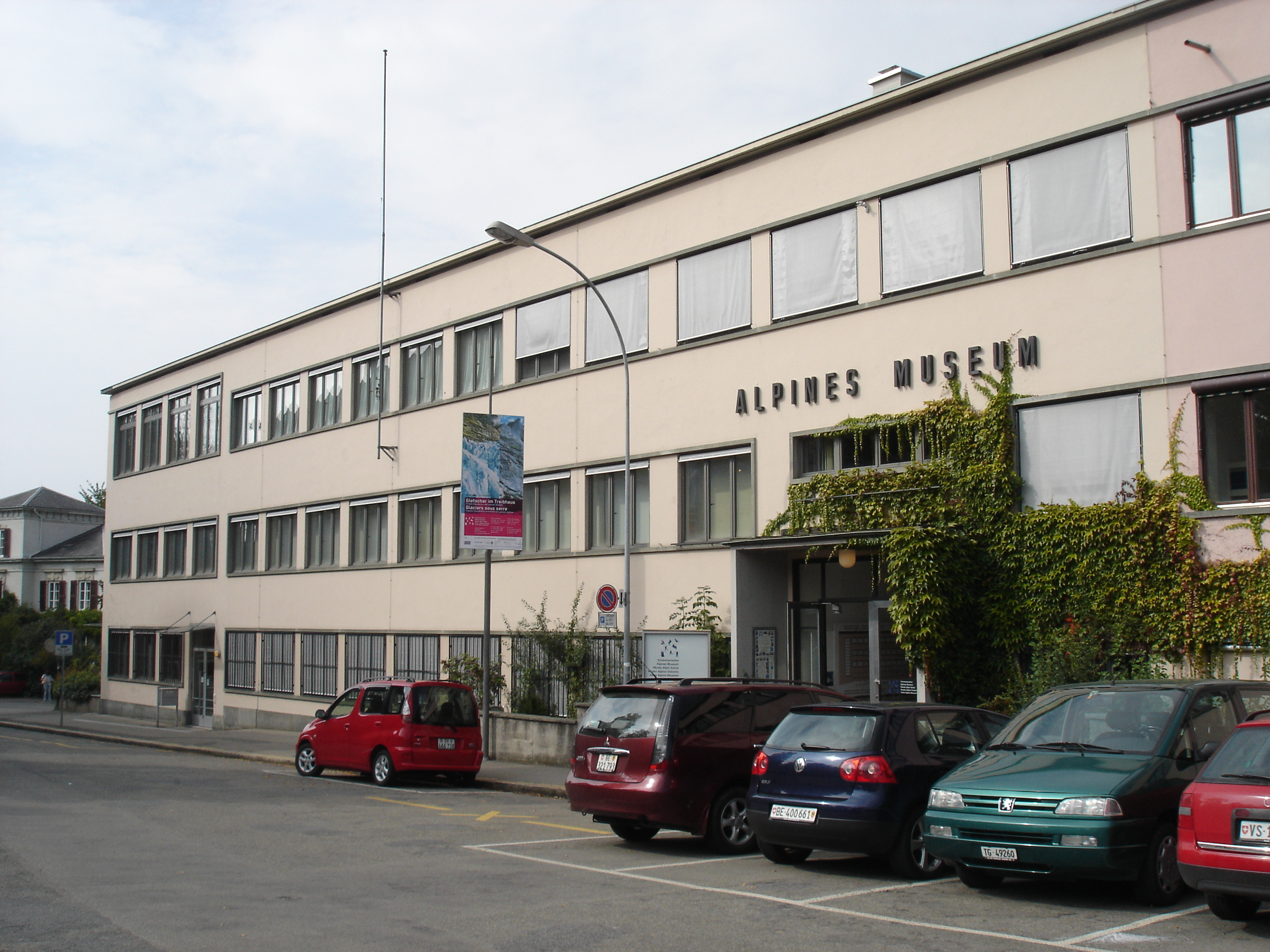
building of the Swiss Alpine Museum

The Swiss Alpine Museum (German: Alpines Museum der Schweiz; French: Musée Alpin Suisse) is a museum focusing on the relationship between mountains and people, culture, and nature in the Swiss Alps. It is located at Helvetiaplatz 4 in Bern.

The museum is dedicated to the history and natural science issues of the entire Alpine region. The museum maintains an important collection focusing on cartography, alpinism, and mountain photography with over 220,000 photographs. The Alpine Museum houses one of the largest collections of mountain reliefs. It regularly transfers its knowledge to exhibitions, publications, and events.

== History ==
In 1902 the Bernese section of the Swiss Alpine Club Club (SAC) decided to appoint a commission to realize the museum with the purpose not only to make the Alps accessible to mountaineers, but also to explore them. In 1905 the Swiss Alpine Museum was opened in the Rathaus zum Äusseren Stand on Zeughausgasse in Bern.

1933–1934 the new museum building was erected on Helvetiaplatz in Bern's Kirchenfeld district. Today it is a listes building as an example for the Neues Bauen style.

The museum underwent renovation and restoration from 1990 to 1993. A permanent exhibition was created on two floors, while one floor was reserved for changing special exhibitions. There, every eight to ten months a new topic relating to the Alps and the Alpine region was up for debate. Particularly worth mentioning are the exhibitions on climate change in the Alps (2006/2007) and alpine hotels (2008–2010).

== Current concept ==
From September 2011 to March 2012, the museum was once again rebuilt and reopened with a new concept and contemporary focus. The permanent exhibition was replaced by special exhibitions on two floors (700 m²). The smaller exhibition areas "Bivouac", and the "speedboat" of the large "museum steamer" are reserved for experimental small exhibitions taking place with a faster pace of change. These exhibitions are focused on the various approaches and perspectives on the topics, which are constantly being explored anew, not only dealing with natural-historical and geographical aspects but also cultural, social, art-related, and especially present-oriented views and sensitivities.

Since March 2012, the ground floor has housed the restaurant "las alps", which offers specialties from the Alpine regions, and a newly designed museum shop.

The museum is sponsored by the Swiss Alpine Museum Foundation, which was founded in 1933. The founders are the Swiss Confederation, the Canton of Bern, the City of Bern, the Swiss Alpine Club SAC, and the Bern Section of the SAC.

The Alpine Museum is a member of the Museumsquartier Bern association. Since June 2021 has formed the organizational framework for cooperation between cultural and educational institutions between Helvetiaplatz and Kirchenfeldstrasse.

== Funding ==
Since 1933, the museum has been constituted as a foundation supported by the Swiss Alpine Club, the University of Bern, swisstopo, the Federal Office of the Environment, and the Office of Culture of the Canton of Bern. Its annual budget of some CHF 1.8 million is funded to approximately 60 percent by public subsidies. In 2008, the museum's continued existence was threatened by a dispute between federal agencies about the responsibility for its funding, until the federal parliament intervened by mandating the required expenditures.

== Exhibitions ==
- April to August 2016: Out of Africa. How the geranium came to Switzerland.
- October 2016 to January 2018: Our Water. Six Models for the Future.
- January to April 2017: Commercial Art and Dreams of Travel. Anton Reckziegel (1865–1936)
- May to October 2017: The Wolf Is Here.
- October 2017 to February 2018: Constructive Alps. Sustainable Renovation and Construction in the Alps
- February 2018 to September 2019: Beautiful Mountains: A Point of View
- March to August 2018: Construction Site, Work in Progress. The Construction of the Grimsel-Oberaar Hydroelectric
- September to October 2018: Suiza existe. Searching for the past in Esperanza, Argentina
- November 2018 to April 2019: The White Danger. Managing Avalanche Risk in Switzerland
- October 2019 to January 2021: Alpine Workshop. The Artisans.
- March 2021 to September 2022: Let’s Talk about Mountains. Eine filmische Annäherung an Nordkorea.

== See also ==
- List of museums in Bern
- List of museums in Switzerland
