= Olympia Academy =

Group of Einstein's friends in Bern

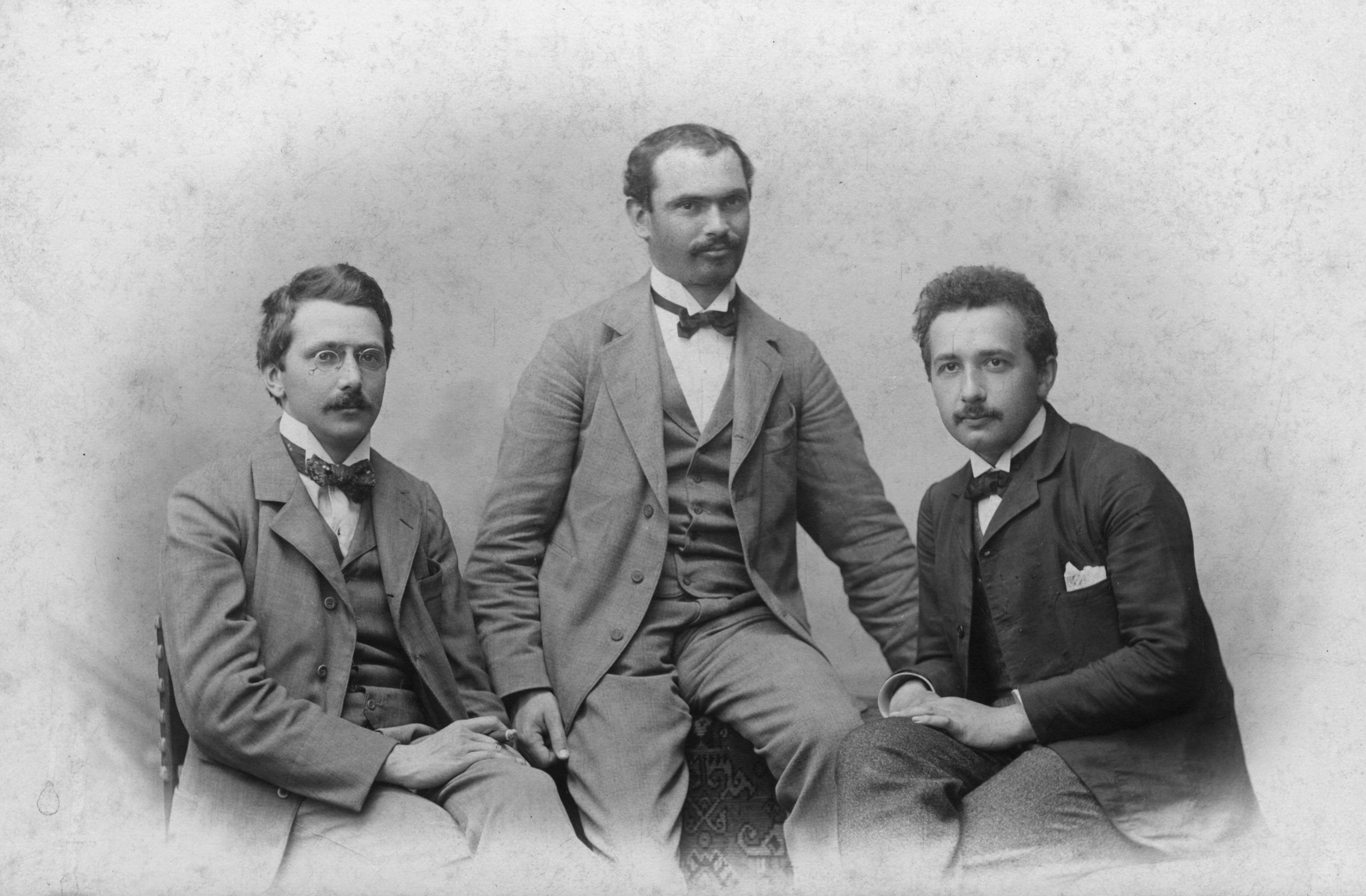
The Olympia Academy founders: Conrad Habicht, Maurice Solovine and Albert Einstein

The Olympia Academy (German: Akademie Olympia) was a group of friends in Bern, Switzerland, who met – usually at Albert Einstein's apartment – to discuss philosophy and physics.

== Overview ==
The group was founded in 1902 by Einstein, Conrad Habicht, and Maurice Solovine, and played a significant role in Einstein's intellectual development. Before his "miracle year" (1905), when Einstein was a patent clerk in Bern, the group of friends met to debate books in the fields of physics and philosophy.

The group's origin lay in Einstein's need to offer private lessons in mathematics and physics in order to make a living (in 1901, before he took up his post at the patent office in Bern). Solovine, a Romanian philosophy student, answered Einstein's newspaper advertisement. In fact neither the tutorials nor any payment materialised; instead, the two began to meet regularly to discuss their shared interest in physics and philosophy. They were soon joined by the mathematician Habicht, who was Einstein's neighbour at Schaffhausen; in 1902 they named themselves the Akademie Olympia, and though a friend would occasionally join them in one of their meetings, the Academy remained essentially just the trio of Einstein, Habicht, and Solovine until the latter two left Bern in 1904 and 1905 respectively.

The first book that Einstein suggested for reading was Karl Pearson's The Grammar of Science. The three discussed their own work and also books such as Ernst Mach’s Analyse der Empfindungen (Analysis of Sensations), Henri Poincaré's La Science et l'Hypothèse (Science and Hypothesis), John Stuart Mill’s A System of Logic, David Hume’s Treatise of Human Nature, and Baruch Spinoza’s Ethics, and sometimes literary works such as Miguel de Cervantes' Don Quixote.

Despite the brief existence of the Academy, it had a lasting effect on the three friends; they remained in touch throughout their lives, and Einstein was to say that it had had an effect on his later scientific career.

== Members and visitors ==
=== Core members ===
- Albert Einstein (1879–1955), core member, host and chairman. Graduate of the ETH Zurich
- Maurice Solovine (1875–1958), core member, philosophy student
- Conrad Habicht (1876–1958), core member, mathematician

=== Others ===
- Paul Habicht (1884–1948), brother of Conrad Habicht.
- Michele Besso (1873–1955), mechanical engineer
- Marcel Grossmann (1878–1936), mathematician, Einstein's friend and classmate
- Lucien Chavan (1868–1942), electrical engineer
- Mileva Marić (1875–1948), Einstein's first wife (married January 6, 1903) and fellow student at ETH Zurich. Solovine reported that she observed the discussions without participating.

== Sources ==
- Küpper, Hans-Josef (2005), The Bernese "Akademie Olympia", einstein-website.de, archived from the original on 2018-06-24
