= Annus mirabilis papers =

Published papers of Albert Einstein in 1905

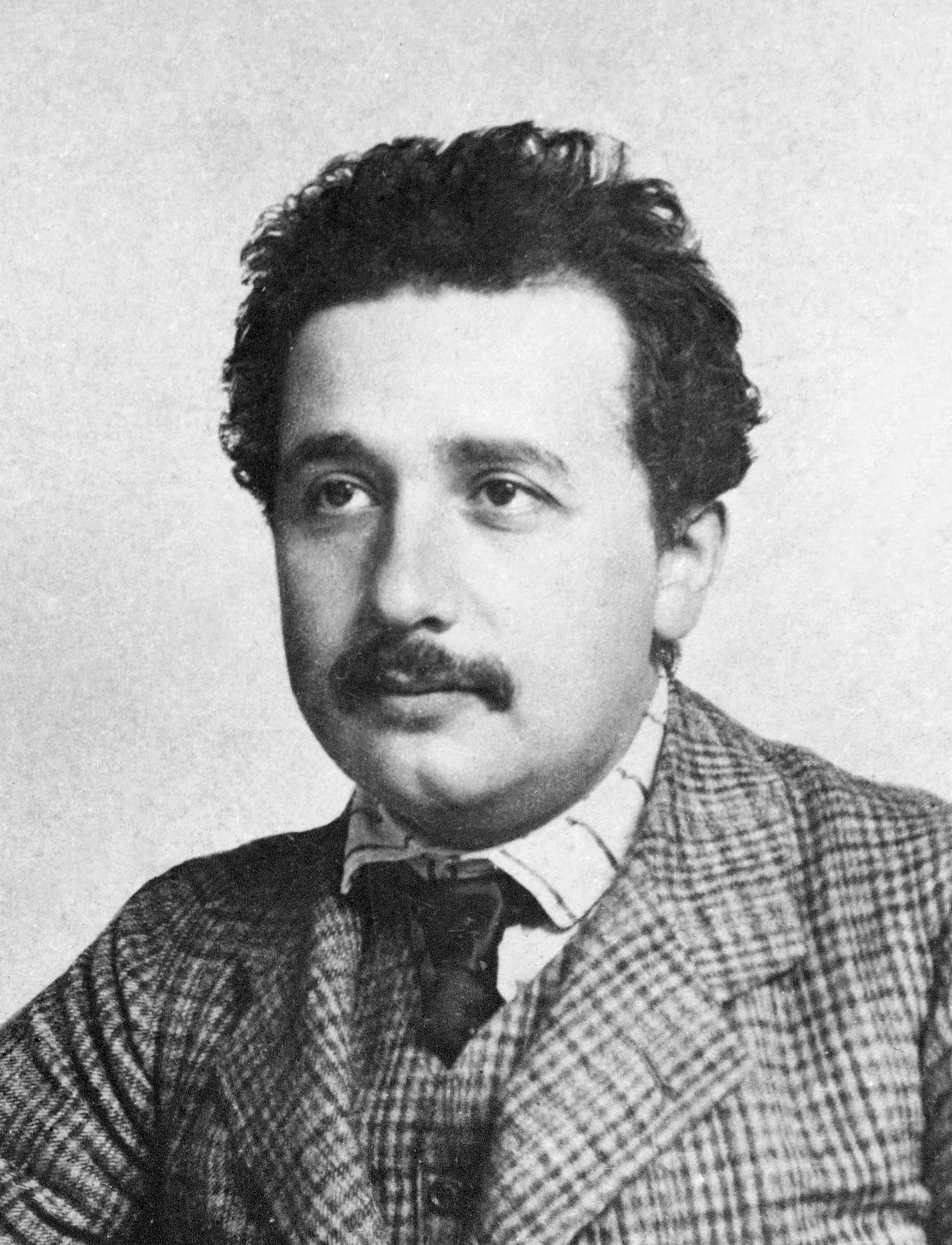
Einstein in 1904 or 1905, about the time he wrote the annus mirabilis papers

The annus mirabilis papers (from Latin: annus mirabilis, lit. 'miraculous year') are four papers (Note: Some sources list a fifth paper, his PhD thesis.) that Albert Einstein published in the scientific journal Annalen der Physik (Annals of Physics) in 1905. As major contributions to the foundation of modern physics, these scientific publications were the ones for which he gained fame among physicists. They revolutionized science's understanding of the fundamental concepts of space, time, mass, and energy.

1. The first paper explained the photoelectric effect, which established the energy of the light quanta $E = hf$, and was the only specific discovery mentioned in the citation awarding Einstein the 1921 Nobel Prize in Physics.
2. The second paper explained Brownian motion, which established the Einstein relation $D = \mu \, k_\text{B} T$ and compelled physicists to accept the existence of atoms.
3. The third paper introduced Einstein's special theory of relativity, which proclaims the constancy of the speed of light $c$ and derives the Lorentz transformations. Einstein also examined relativistic aberration and the transverse Doppler effect.
4. The fourth, a consequence of special relativity, developed the principle of mass–energy equivalence, expressed in the equation $E = mc^2$ and which led to the discovery and use of nuclear power decades later.

These four papers, together with quantum mechanics and Einstein's later general theory of relativity, are the foundation of modern physics.

== Background ==
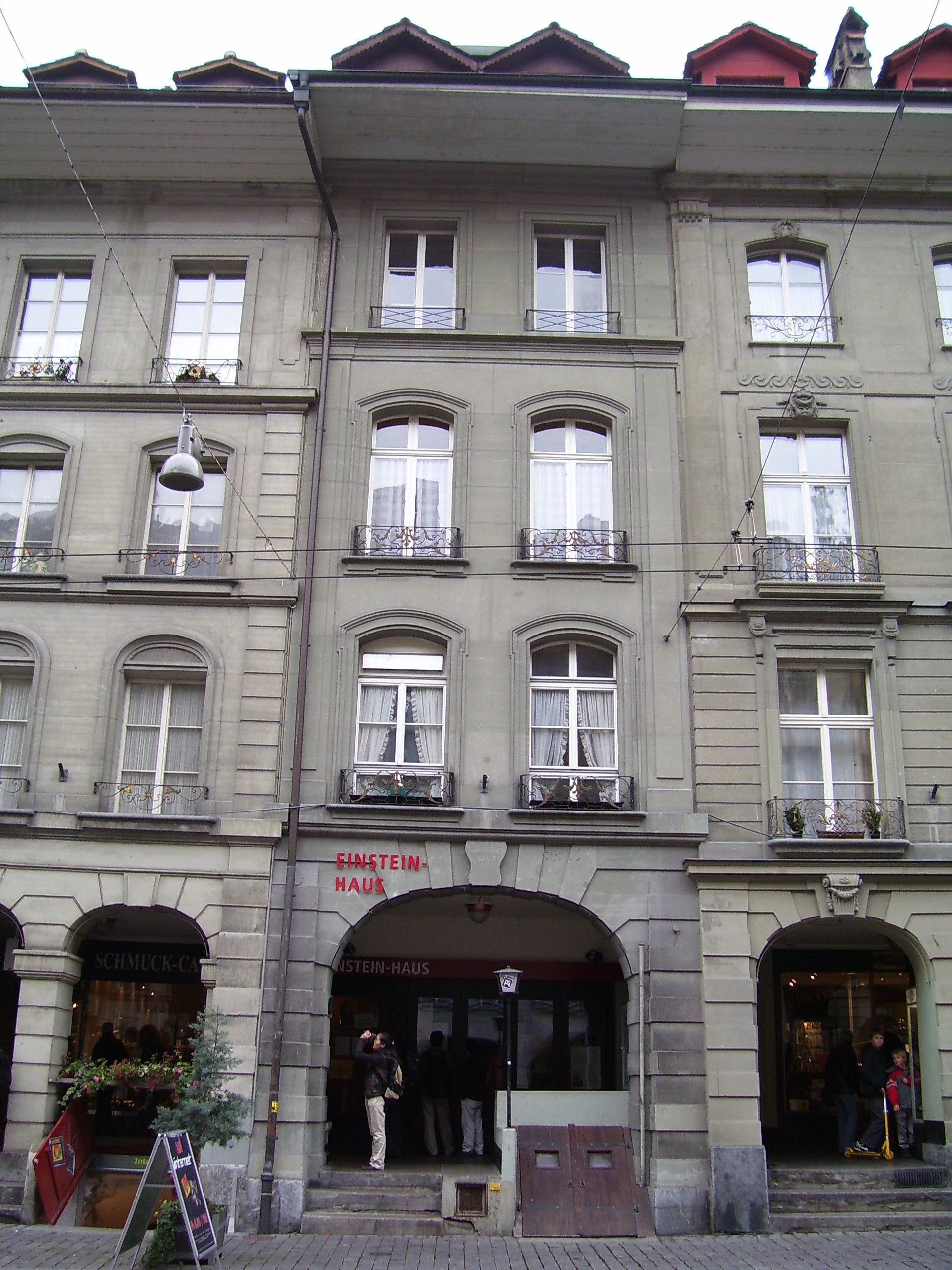
The Einsteinhaus on the Kramgasse in Bern, Einstein's residence at the time. Most of the papers were written in his apartment on the first floor above the street level.

At the time the papers were written, Einstein did not have easy access to a complete set of scientific reference materials, although he did regularly read and contribute reviews to Annalen der Physik. Additionally, scientific colleagues available to discuss his theories were few. He worked as an examiner at the Patent Office in Bern, Switzerland, and he later said of a co-worker there, Michele Besso, that he "could not have found a better sounding board for my ideas in all of Europe". In addition, co-workers and the other members of the self-styled "Olympia Academy" (Maurice Solovine and Conrad Habicht) and his wife, Mileva Marić, had some influence on Einstein's work, but how much is unclear.

Through these papers, Einstein tackled some of the era's most important physics questions and problems. In 1900, Lord Kelvin, in a lecture titled "Nineteenth-Century Clouds over the Dynamical Theory of Heat and Light", suggested that physics had no satisfactory explanations for the results of the Michelson–Morley experiment and for black body radiation. As introduced, special relativity provided an account for the results of the Michelson–Morley experiments. Einstein's explanation of the photoelectric effect extended the quantum theory which Max Planck had developed in his successful explanation of black-body radiation.

Despite the greater fame achieved by his other works, such as that on special relativity, it was his work on the photoelectric effect that won him his Nobel Prize in 1921. The Nobel committee had waited patiently for experimental confirmation of special relativity; however, none was forthcoming until the time dilation experiments of Ives and Stilwell (1938 and 1941) and Rossi and Hall (1941).

== Papers ==
=== Photoelectric effect ===
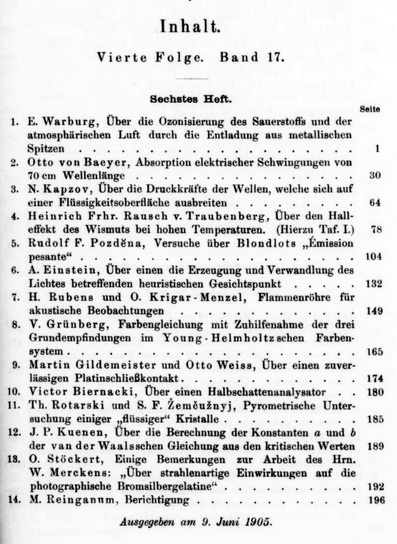
Table of contents of the journal Annalen der Physik for the issue of June 1905. Einstein's paper on the photoelectric effect is sixth on this list.

The article "Über einen die Erzeugung und Verwandlung des Lichtes betreffenden heuristischen Gesichtspunkt" ("On a Heuristic Viewpoint Concerning the Production and Transformation of Light") (Note: Einstein, Albert (1905). "Über einen die Erzeugung und Verwandlung des Lichtes betreffenden heuristischen Gesichtspunkt" [On a Heuristic Point of View about the Creation and Conversion of Light]. Annalen der Physik (in German). 17 (6): 132–148. Bibcode:1905AnP...322..132E. doi:10.1002/andp.19053220607. English translations: Einstein, Albert. "On a Heuristic Point of View about the Creation and Conversion of Light" (PDF). Translated by Ter Haar, Dirk.; Einstein, Albert. "On a Heuristic Point of View about the Creation and Conversion of Light" – via Wikisource.) received 18 March and published 9 June, proposed the idea of energy quanta. This idea, motivated by Max Planck's earlier derivation of the law of black-body radiation (which was preceded by the discovery of Wien's displacement law, by Wilhelm Wien, several years prior to Planck) assumes that luminous energy can be absorbed or emitted only in discrete amounts, called quanta. Einstein states,

Energy, during the propagation of a ray of light, is not continuously distributed over steadily increasing spaces, but it consists of a finite number of energy quanta localised at points in space, moving without dividing and capable of being absorbed or generated only as entities.

In explaining the photoelectric effect, the hypothesis that energy consists of discrete packets, as Einstein illustrates, can be directly applied to black bodies, as well.

The idea of light quanta contradicts the wave theory of light that follows naturally from Maxwell's equations for electromagnetic behavior and, more generally, the assumption of infinite divisibility of energy in physical systems.

A profound formal difference exists between the theoretical concepts that physicists have formed about gases and other ponderable bodies, and Maxwell's theory of electromagnetic processes in so-called empty space. While we consider the state of a body to be completely determined by the positions and velocities of an indeed very large yet finite number of atoms and electrons, we make use of continuous spatial functions to determine the electromagnetic state of a volume of space, so that a finite number of quantities cannot be considered as sufficient for the complete determination of the electromagnetic state of space.

... [this] leads to contradictions when applied to the phenomena of emission and transformation of light.

According to the view that the incident light consists of energy quanta ... the production of cathode rays by light can be conceived in the following way. The body's surface layer is penetrated by energy quanta whose energy is converted at least partially into kinetic energy of the electrons. The simplest conception is that a light quantum transfers its entire energy to a single electron ...

Einstein noted that the photoelectric effect depended on the wavelength, and hence the frequency of the light. At too low a frequency, even intense light produced no electrons. However, once a certain frequency was reached, even low intensity light produced electrons. He compared this to Planck's hypothesis that light could be emitted only in packets of energy given by hf, where h is the Planck constant and f is the frequency. He then postulated that light travels in packets whose energy depends on the frequency, and therefore only light above a certain frequency would bring sufficient energy to liberate an electron.

By 1921, when Einstein was awarded the Nobel Prize and his work on photoelectricity was mentioned by name in the award citation, some physicists accepted that the equation ($hf = \Phi + E_k$) was correct and light quanta were possible. In 1923, Arthur Compton's X-ray scattering experiment helped more of the scientific community to accept this formula. The theory of light quanta was a strong indicator of wave–particle duality, a fundamental principle of quantum mechanics. A complete picture of the theory of photoelectricity was realized after the maturity of quantum mechanics.

=== Brownian motion ===
The article "Über die von der molekularkinetischen Theorie der Wärme geforderte Bewegung von in ruhenden Flüssigkeiten suspendierten Teilchen" ("On the Motion of Small Particles Suspended in a Stationary Liquid, as Required by the Molecular Kinetic Theory of Heat"), (Note: Einstein, Albert (1905). "Über die von der molekularkinetischen Theorie der Wärme geforderte Bewegung von in ruhenden Flüssigkeiten suspendierten Teilchen" [Investigations on the theory of Brownian Movement]. Annalen der Physik (in German). 322 (8): 549–560. Bibcode:1905AnP...322..549E. doi:10.1002/andp.19053220806. English translation: Einstein, Albert. "Investigations on the theory of Brownian Movement" (PDF). Translated by Cowper, A. D.) received 11 May and published 18 July, delineated a stochastic model of Brownian motion.

In this paper it will be shown that, according to the molecular kinetic theory of heat, bodies of a microscopically visible size suspended in liquids must, as a result of thermal molecular motions, perform motions of such magnitudes that they can be easily observed with a microscope. It is possible that the motions to be discussed here are identical with so-called Brownian molecular motion; however, the data available to me on the latter are so imprecise that I could not form a judgment on the question...

Einstein derived expressions for the mean squared displacement of particles. Using the kinetic theory of gases, which at the time was controversial, the article established that the phenomenon, which had lacked a satisfactory explanation even decades after it was first observed, provided empirical evidence for the reality of the atom. It also lent credence to statistical mechanics, which had been controversial at that time, as well. Before this paper, atoms were recognized as a useful concept, but physicists and chemists debated whether atoms were real entities. Einstein's statistical discussion of atomic behavior gave experimentalists a way to count atoms by looking through an ordinary microscope. Wilhelm Ostwald, one of the leaders of the anti-atom school, later told Arnold Sommerfeld that he had been convinced of the existence of atoms by Jean Perrin's subsequent Brownian motion experiments.

=== Special relativity ===
Einstein's "Zur Elektrodynamik bewegter Körper" ("On the Electrodynamics of Moving Bodies"), (Note: Einstein, Albert (30 June 1905). "Zur Elektrodynamik bewegter Körper" [On the Electrodynamics of Moving Bodies]. Annalen der Physik (in German). 17 (10): 891–921. Bibcode:1905AnP...322..891E. doi:10.1002/andp.19053221004. English translations: Einstein, Albert (1923). "On the Electrodynamics of Moving Bodies". The Principle of Relativity. Translated by George Barker Jeffery; Wilfrid Perrett. London: Methuen and Company.; Einstein, Albert (1920). "On the Electrodynamics of Moving Bodies". The Principle of Relativity: Original Papers by A. Einstein and H. Minkowski. Translated by Megh Nad Saha. University of Calcutta. pp. 1–34.) his third paper that year, was received on 30 June and published 26 September. It reconciles Maxwell's equations for electricity and magnetism with the laws of mechanics by introducing major changes to mechanics close to the speed of light. This later became known as Einstein's special theory of relativity.

The paper mentions the names of only five other scientists: Isaac Newton, James Clerk Maxwell, Heinrich Hertz, Christian Doppler, and Hendrik Lorentz. It does not have any references to any other publications. Many of the ideas had already been published by others, as detailed in history of special relativity and relativity priority dispute. However, Einstein's paper introduces a theory of time, distance, mass, and energy that was consistent with electromagnetism, but omitted gravity.

At the time, it was known that Maxwell's equations, when applied to moving bodies, led to asymmetries (moving magnet and conductor problem), and that it had not been possible to discover any motion of the Earth relative to the aether. Einstein puts forward two postulates to explain these observations. First, he applies the principle of relativity, which states that the laws of physics remain the same for any non-accelerating frame of reference (called an inertial reference frame), to the laws of electrodynamics and optics as well as mechanics. In the second postulate, Einstein proposes that the speed of light has the same value in all frames of reference, independent of the state of motion of the emitting body.

Special relativity is thus consistent with the result of the Michelson–Morley experiment, which had not detected a medium of conductance (the aether) for light waves unlike other known waves that require a medium (such as water or air), and which had been crucial for the development of the Lorentz transformations and the principle of relativity. Einstein may not have known about that experiment, but states,

Examples of this sort, together with the unsuccessful attempts to discover any motion of the earth relatively to the "light medium", suggest that the phenomena of electrodynamics as well as of mechanics possess no properties corresponding to the idea of absolute rest.

The speed of light is fixed, and thus not relative to the movement of the observer. This was impossible under Newtonian classical mechanics. Einstein argues,

the same laws of electrodynamics and optics will be valid for all frames of reference for which the equations of mechanics hold good. We will raise this conjecture (the purport of which will hereafter be called the "Principle of Relativity") to the status of a postulate, and also introduce another postulate, which is only apparently irreconcilable with the former, namely, that light is always propagated in empty space with a definite velocity c which is independent of the state of motion of the emitting body. These two postulates suffice for the attainment of a simple and consistent theory of the electrodynamics of moving bodies based on Maxwell's theory for stationary bodies. The introduction of a "luminiferous ether" will prove to be superfluous in as much as the view here to be developed will not require an "absolutely stationary space" provided with special properties, nor assign a velocity-vector to a point of the empty space in which electromagnetic processes take place. The theory ... is based—like all electrodynamics—on the kinematics of the rigid body, since the assertions of any such theory have to do with the relationships between rigid bodies (systems of co-ordinates), clocks, and electromagnetic processes. Insufficient consideration of this circumstance lies at the root of the difficulties which the electrodynamics of moving bodies at present encounters.

It had previously been proposed, by George FitzGerald in 1889 and by Lorentz in 1892, independently of each other, that the Michelson–Morley result could be accounted for if moving bodies were contracted in the direction of their motion. Some of the paper's core equations, the Lorentz transforms, had been published by Joseph Larmor (1897, 1900), Hendrik Lorentz (1895, 1899, 1904) and Henri Poincaré (1905), in a development of Lorentz's 1904 paper. Einstein's presentation differed from the explanations given by FitzGerald, Larmor, and Lorentz, but was similar in many respects to the formulation by Poincaré (1905).

His explanation arises from two axioms. The first is the idea originating with Galileo Galilei that the laws of nature should be the same for all observers that move with constant speed relative to each other. Einstein writes,

The laws by which the states of physical systems undergo change are not affected, whether these changes of state be referred to the one or the other of two systems of co-ordinates in uniform translatory motion.

The second axiom is the rule that the speed of light is the same for every observer.

Any ray of light moves in the "stationary" system of co-ordinates with the determined velocity c, whether the ray be emitted by a stationary or by a moving body.

The theory, now called the special theory of relativity, distinguishes it from his later general theory of relativity, which considers all observers to be equivalent. Acknowledging the role of Max Planck in the early dissemination of his ideas, Einstein wrote in 1913 "The attention that this theory so quickly received from colleagues is surely to be ascribed in large part to the resoluteness and warmth with which he [Planck] intervened for this theory". In addition, the spacetime formulation by Hermann Minkowski in 1907 was influential in gaining widespread acceptance. Also, and most importantly, the theory was supported by an ever-increasing body of confirmatory experimental evidence.

=== Mass–energy equivalence ===
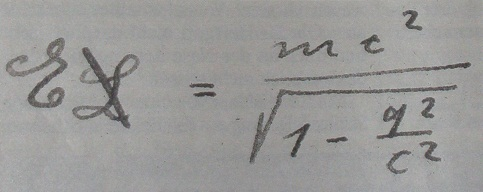
Einstein's mass–energy equation in a 1912 manuscript. He originally used $L$ to represent energy instead of $E$, and $V$ instead of $c$ for the speed of light.

On 21 November Annalen der Physik published a fourth paper (received September 27): "Ist die Trägheit eines Körpers von seinem Energieinhalt abhängig?" ("Does the Inertia of a Body Depend Upon Its Energy Content?"), (Note: Einstein, Albert (1905). "Ist die Trägheit eines Körpers von seinem Energieinhalt abhängig?" [Does the Inertia of a Body Depend Upon Its Energy Content?]. Annalen der Physik (in German). 18 (13): 639–641. Bibcode:1905AnP...323..639E. doi:10.1002/andp.19053231314. English translations: Einstein, Albert (1923). "Does the Inertia of a Body Depend Upon Its Energy Content?". The Principle of Relativity. Translated by George Barker Jeffery; Wilfrid Perrett. London: Methuen and Company, Ltd.) in which Einstein deduced what is sometimes described as the most famous of all equations: E = mc^{2}.

Einstein considered the equivalency equation to be of paramount importance because it showed that a massive particle possesses an energy, the "rest energy", distinct from its classical kinetic and potential energies. The paper is based on Maxwell and Hertz's investigations and, in addition, the axioms of relativity, as Einstein states,

The results of the previous investigation lead to a very interesting conclusion, which is here to be deduced.

The previous investigation was based "on the Maxwell–Hertz equations for empty space, together with the Maxwellian expression for the electromagnetic energy of space ..."

The laws by which the states of physical systems alter are independent of the alternative, to which of two systems of coordinates, in uniform motion of parallel translation relatively to each other, these alterations of state are referred (principle of relativity).

The equation sets forth that the energy of a body at rest (E) equals its mass (m) times the speed of light (c) squared, or E = mc^{2}.

If a body gives off the energy L in the form of radiation, its mass diminishes by L/c^{2}. The fact that the energy withdrawn from the body becomes energy of radiation evidently makes no difference, so that we are led to the more general conclusion that

The mass of a body is a measure of its energy-content; if the energy changes by L, the mass changes in the same sense by L/(9 × 10^{20}), the energy being measured in ergs, and the mass in grammes.

...

If the theory corresponds to the facts, radiation conveys inertia between the emitting and absorbing bodies.

The mass–energy relation can be used to predict how much energy will be released or consumed by nuclear reactions; one simply measures the mass of all constituents and the mass of all the products and multiplies the difference between the two by c^{2}. The result shows how much energy will be released or consumed, usually in the form of light or heat. When applied to certain nuclear reactions, the equation shows that an extraordinarily large amount of energy will be released, millions of times as much as in the combustion of chemical explosives, where the amount of mass converted to energy is negligible. This explains why nuclear reactions produce enormous amounts of energy, as they release binding energy during nuclear fission and nuclear fusion, and convert a portion of subatomic mass to energy.

== Commemoration ==
The International Union of Pure and Applied Physics (IUPAP) resolved to commemorate the 100th year of the publication of Einstein's extensive work in 1905 as the World Year of Physics 2005. This was subsequently endorsed by the United Nations.
