= Münstergasse Library =

Library in Bern, Switzerland

- Bibliothek Münstergasse
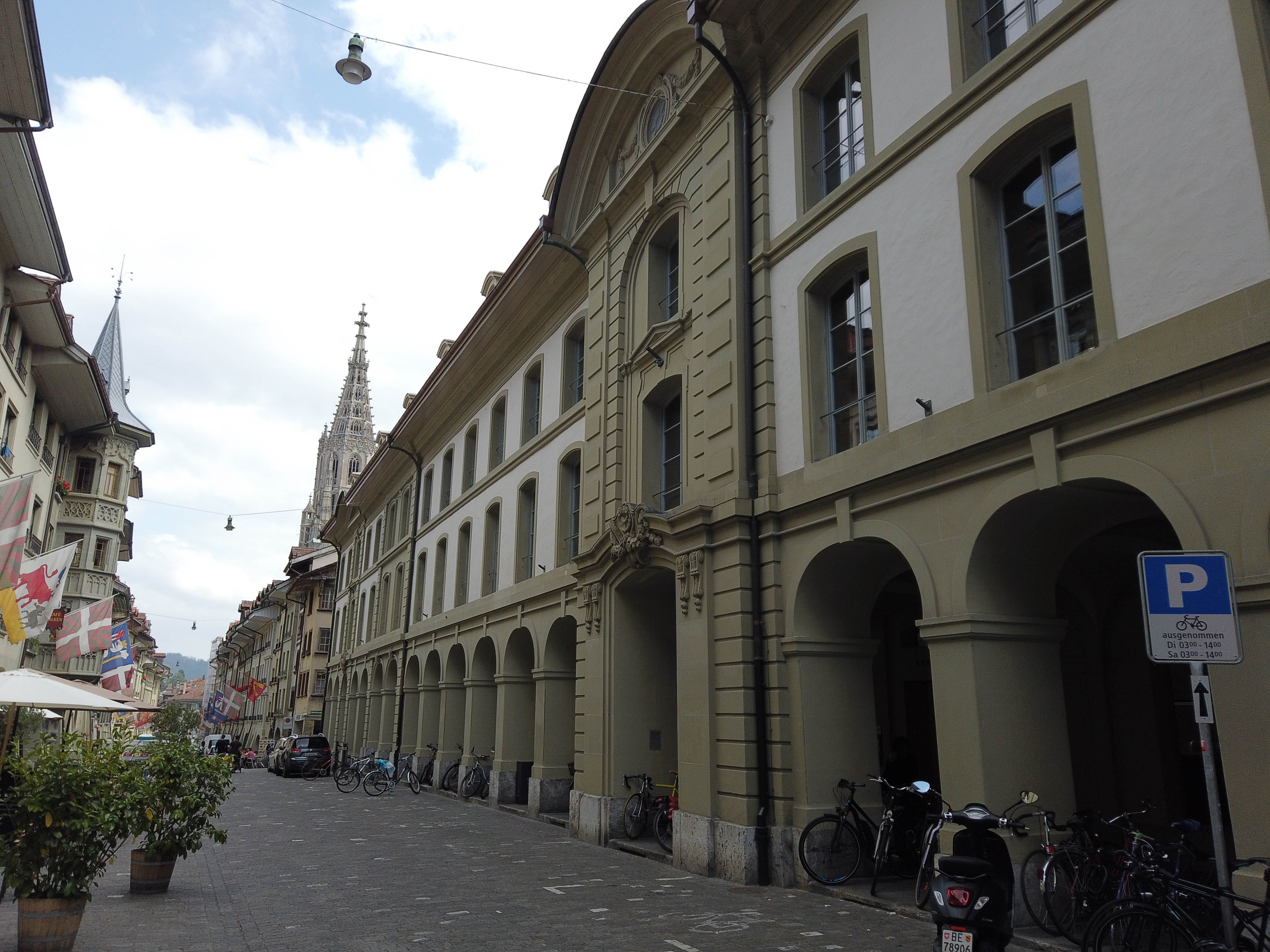
- Front façade of the Bibliothek Münstergasse, Bern
- 46.947577557829796°N 7.449584416823758°E
- Location: Bern, Switzerland
- Type: public scientific library
- Established: 1600

Other information
- Affiliation: University Library of Bern
- Website: https://www.ub.unibe.ch/teilbibliotheken/bibliothek_muenstergasse/index_ger.html/

The Münstergasse Library is a public scientific library and the oldest branch library of the University Library of Bern. It is located on Münstergasse 61, Bern.

== Holdings ==
Unlike the 28 other sub-libraries of the University Library, the Münstergasse Library (the former Central Library) is not a subject or departmental library. Since the renovation in 2014 to 2016, it has been designed as a learning and meeting place and is one of the pick-up and return locations for the printed collections of the University Library. It fulfills the collection mandate for the University Library as a cantonal library and collects the works of Bernese writers as well as literature on the Canton of Bern, Bernese localities and personalities (Bernensia). As part of the Bernensia collection mandate, the Münstergasse Library also maintains the online encyclopedia Literapedia Bern, which serves as both an encyclopedia and bibliography of Bernese fiction.

A main focus of the collection is the historical holdings, such as the printed works from the library of the French scholar and diplomat Jacques Bongars (1554-1612) or the important map collection of the Bernese statesman and geographer Johann Friedrich von Ryhiner (1732-1803).

== Building History ==
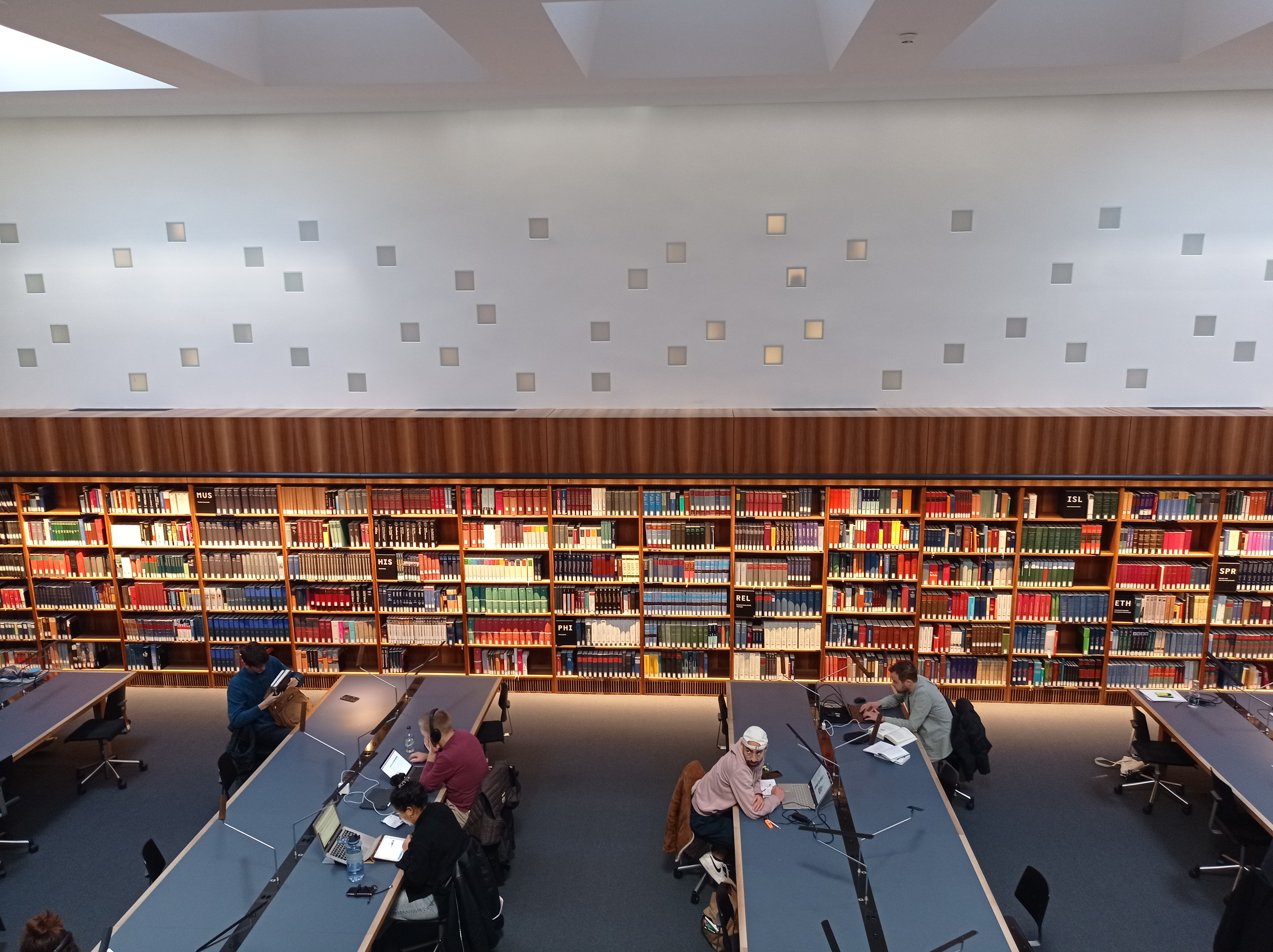
Reading room at the basement of Bibliothek Münstergasse

The origins of the library can be traced back to 1535, after the Reformation. At that time, the High School for the education of Reformed pastors was established in the Canons' Monastery of St. Vincent (on Münsterplatz), later moving to the former Barfüsserkloster (near today's Casino). Between 1533 and 1535, the book collections of the Lateinschule, the Chorherrenstift, and the abolished Bernese monasteries (particularly Thorberg) were brought together to form the Liberey of the University.

In 1773 to 1775, a library gallery was built near today's west wing (Casinoplatz) by Niklaus Sprüngli. This was followed in 1787 to 1794 by the conversion of the Ankenwaag grain house into a library by Sprüngli and Lorenz Schmid. With its own dedicated building, the Burgerbibliothek became the first secular library in Switzerland. The present Schultheissensaal was set up as a ceremonial and exhibition hall, and the present Hallersaal was used as an annex.

Over the years, the library has undergone several expansions and renovations to meet the changing needs of its patrons. In 1755 to 1760, the Ankenwaag house was constructed as a granary, imperial wine cellar, and market hall for dairy products by Ludwig Emanuel Zehender. In 1860 to 1863, an eastern extension was added to the building (Münstergasse 61) by Gottlieb Hebler. In 1904 to 1905, a western extension was built (Münstergasse 63) by Eduard von Rodt. This was followed in 1906 to 1907 by an extension of the east wing towards Herrengasse, also by von Rodt.

In 1968 to 1974, the library underwent a major remodeling and expansion, with the west wing being gutted and new rooms created for the Burgerbibliothek, the West Reading Room, and the Lecture Hall. The courtyard was given a basement, and the basement reading room and stacks were created. The fourth and fifth basement levels were built as a "three-atü shelter", with a collective shelter for 550 people on the fourth level, including a kitchen, storage room, and WC facilities, as well as a command post. From the fifth basement level, which is used to protect cultural assets, an escape tunnel was built under Herrengasse and the casino, leading to Frickweg.

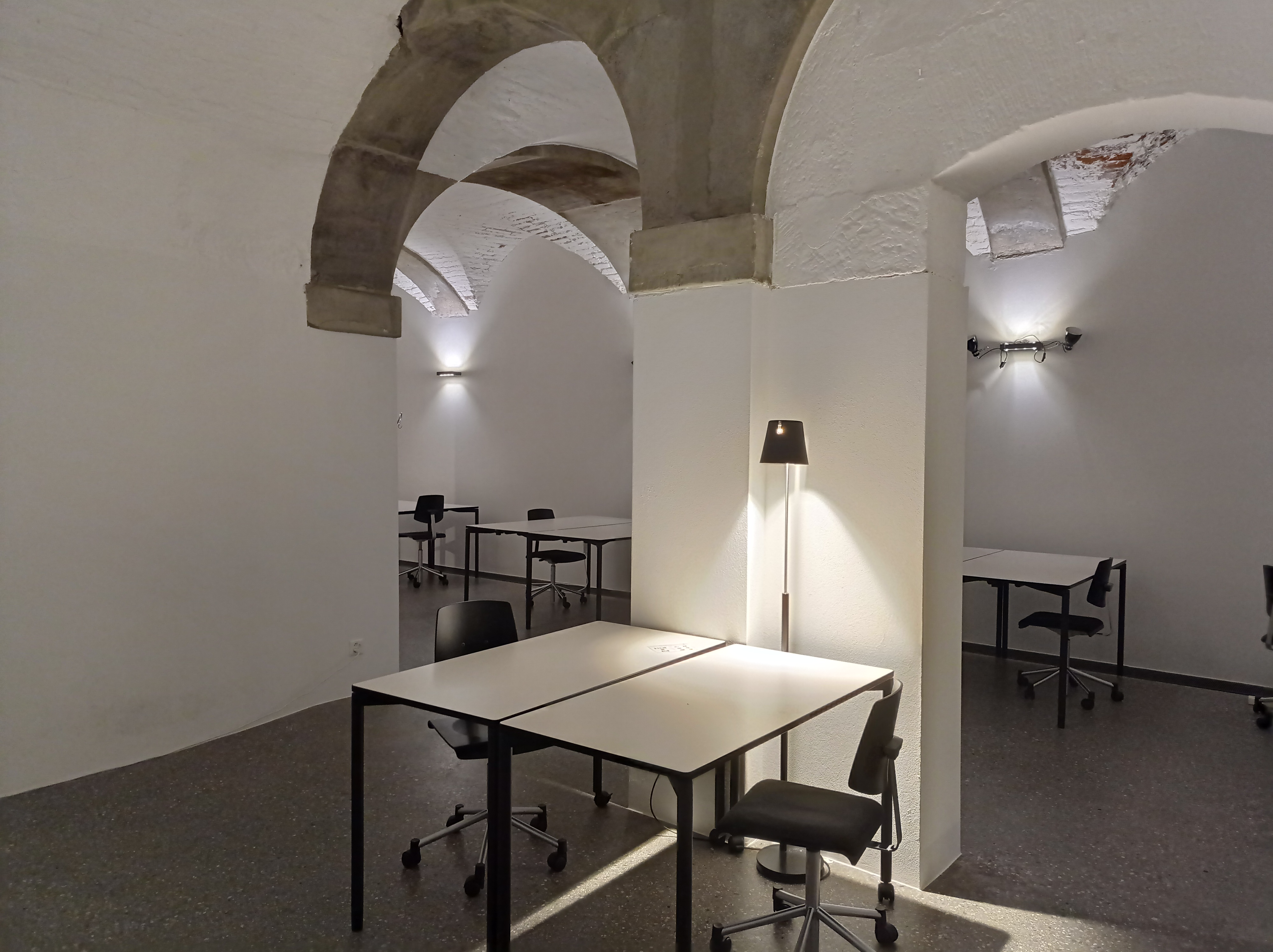
Study room at the Bibliothek Münstergasse

More recently, in 2014 to 2016, the library underwent a major reconstruction, with an investment of 37.3 million Swiss francs. The last comprehensive conversion with complete renovation was carried out in 2014 - 2016 by the Alb Architektengemeinschaft AG on behalf of the Burgergemeinde Bern. The building houses the Burgerbibliothek, which is the public archive of the Burgergemeinde Bern, and the Bibliothek Münstergasse as a branch library of the University Library of Bern.

The two institutions now have at their disposal a building that is both modern and distinctive in its historical references. It is more transparent, more open and brighter than before the renovation. It not only fulfills the requirements of modern library and archive operations, but with its new window front and the Café Lesbar also characterizes the space of the upper Münstergasse.

The Münstergasse Library is available for free use by the University of Bern and the public. It offers access to printed and electronic media, as well as more than 300 reading and learning workstations, study room, study hall, and a wide range of consulting and training services.

== Catalog ==
As a branch library of the University Library of Bern, the Münstergasse Library was affiliated with the Informationsverbund Deutschschweiz (IDS) until the end of March 2021. Together with the University Library of Basel, the University Library of Bern operated the search interface swissbib Basel Bern, which could be used to search the holdings of both university libraries, the libraries of the Bern University of Applied Science and Northwestern Switzerland located in Bern or Basel, as well as the Swiss National Library and the library of the Swiss National Bank in Bern.

As part of University Library of Bern, Münstergasse Library user also has access to Swisscovery, The national platform that brings together scientific information from around 490 libraries in Switzerland.
