= Zähringerbrunnen =

Fountain in Bern, Switzerland

Coordinates: 46.947923°N 7.449185°E

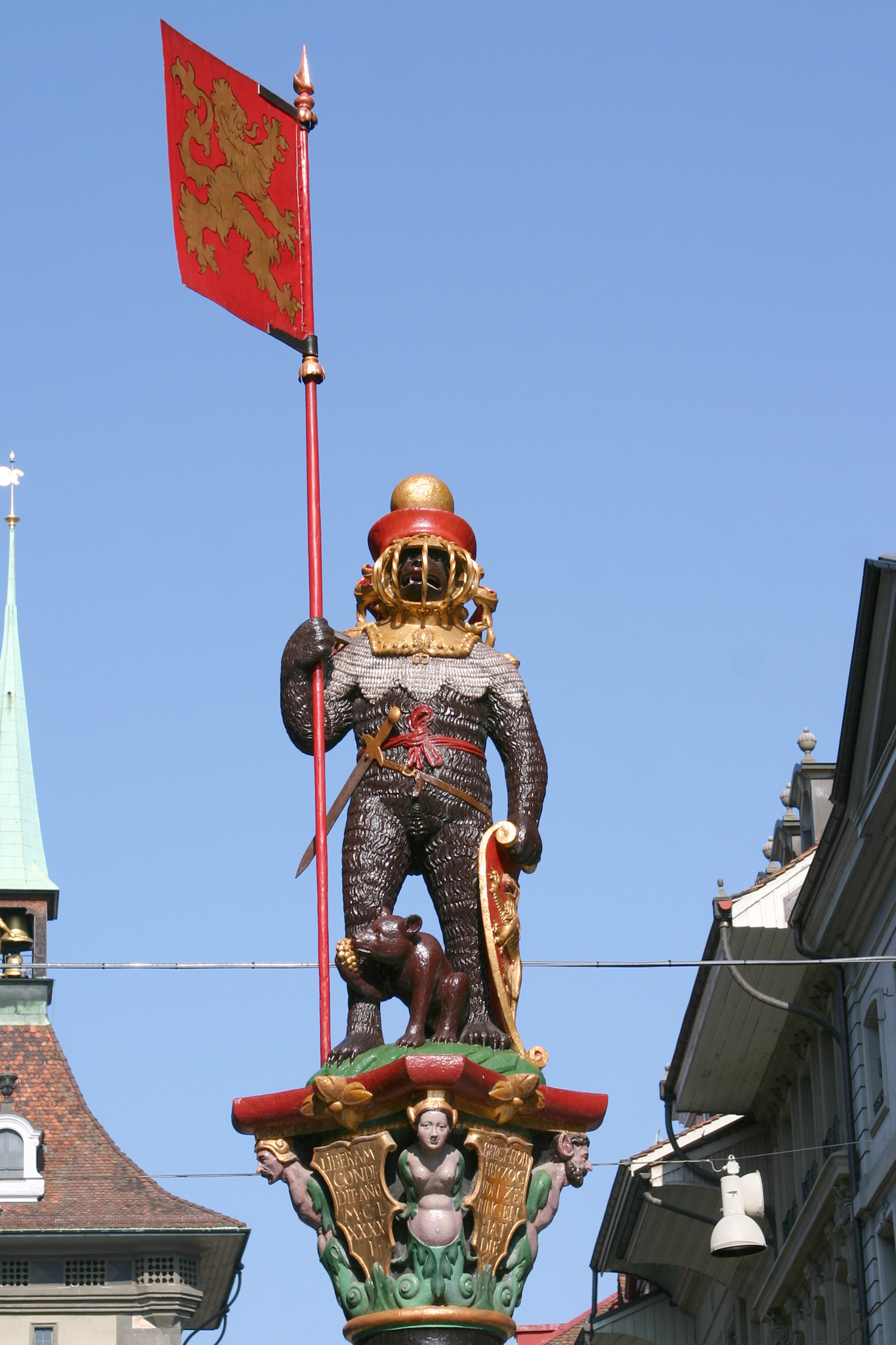
The Zähringer fountain with Zytglogge in the background.

The Zähringerbrunnen (Zähringen Fountain) is a fountain on Kramgasse in the Old City of Bern, Switzerland. It is a Swiss Cultural Property of National Significance and is part of the UNESCO World Heritage Site of the Old City of Bern.

== History ==
The Zähringerbrunnen was built in 1535 as a memorial to the founder of Bern – Berthold V, Duke of Zähringen. The statue is a bear in full armor, with another bear cub at his feet. The bear represents the bear that, according to legend, Berchtold shot on the Aare peninsula as he was searching for a site to build a city. The armored bear carries a shield and a banner, both emblazoned with the Zähringen lion.

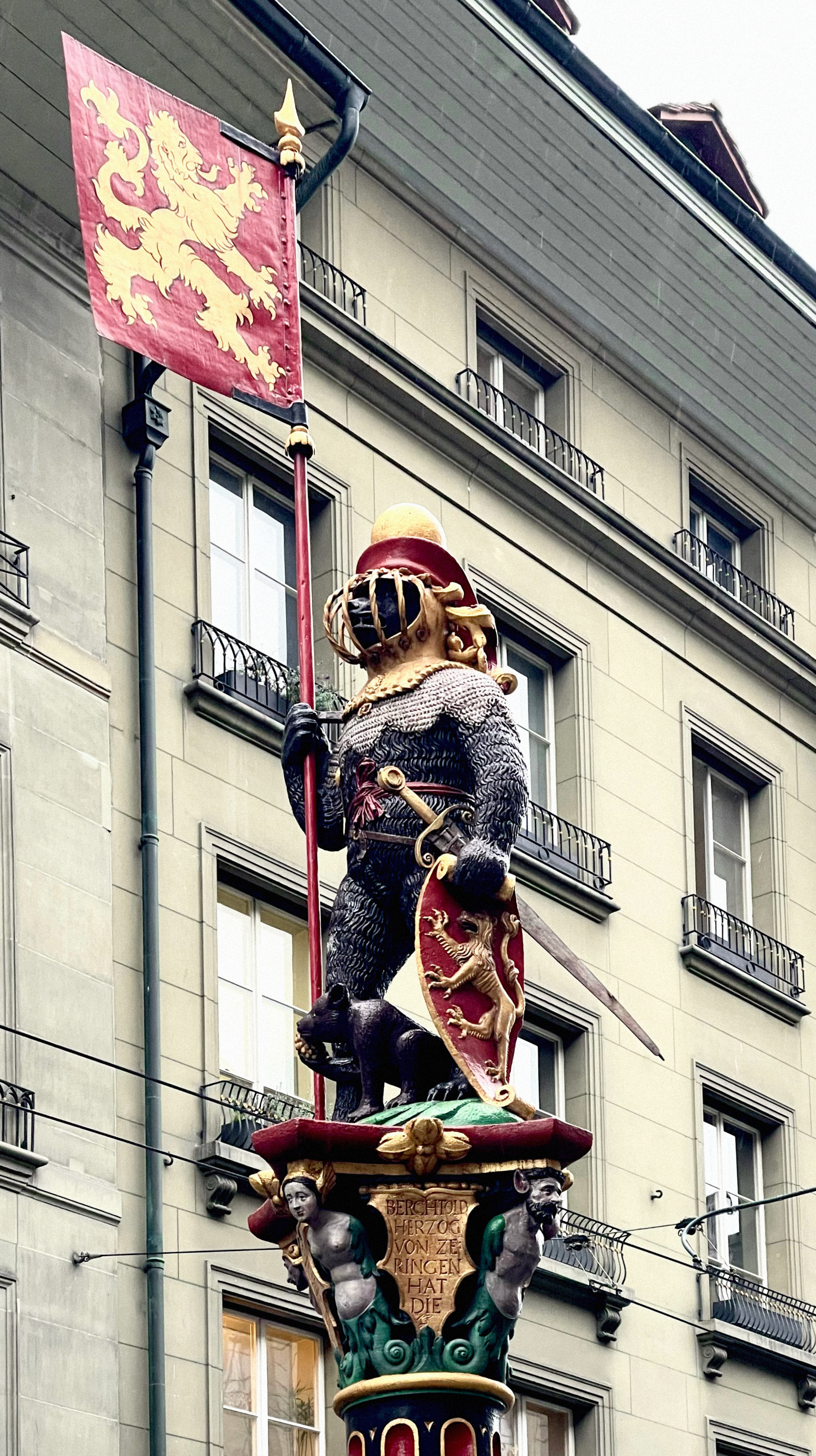
The Zähringer fountain (2024)

The basin below the fountain bore the date 1542 until 1889 when the entire basin was replaced. At the same time the column and figure were repainted. The old basin was octagonal. On one face it had the inscription Protege Nos Domine and on another Soli Deo Gloria. Another face had the date 1542 in Roman numerals and the fourth had an inscription that was unreadable in the 19th century. The current basin is an exact replica of the Pfeiferbrunnen's basin.
