= Conrad Habicht =

Swiss mathematician (1876–1958)

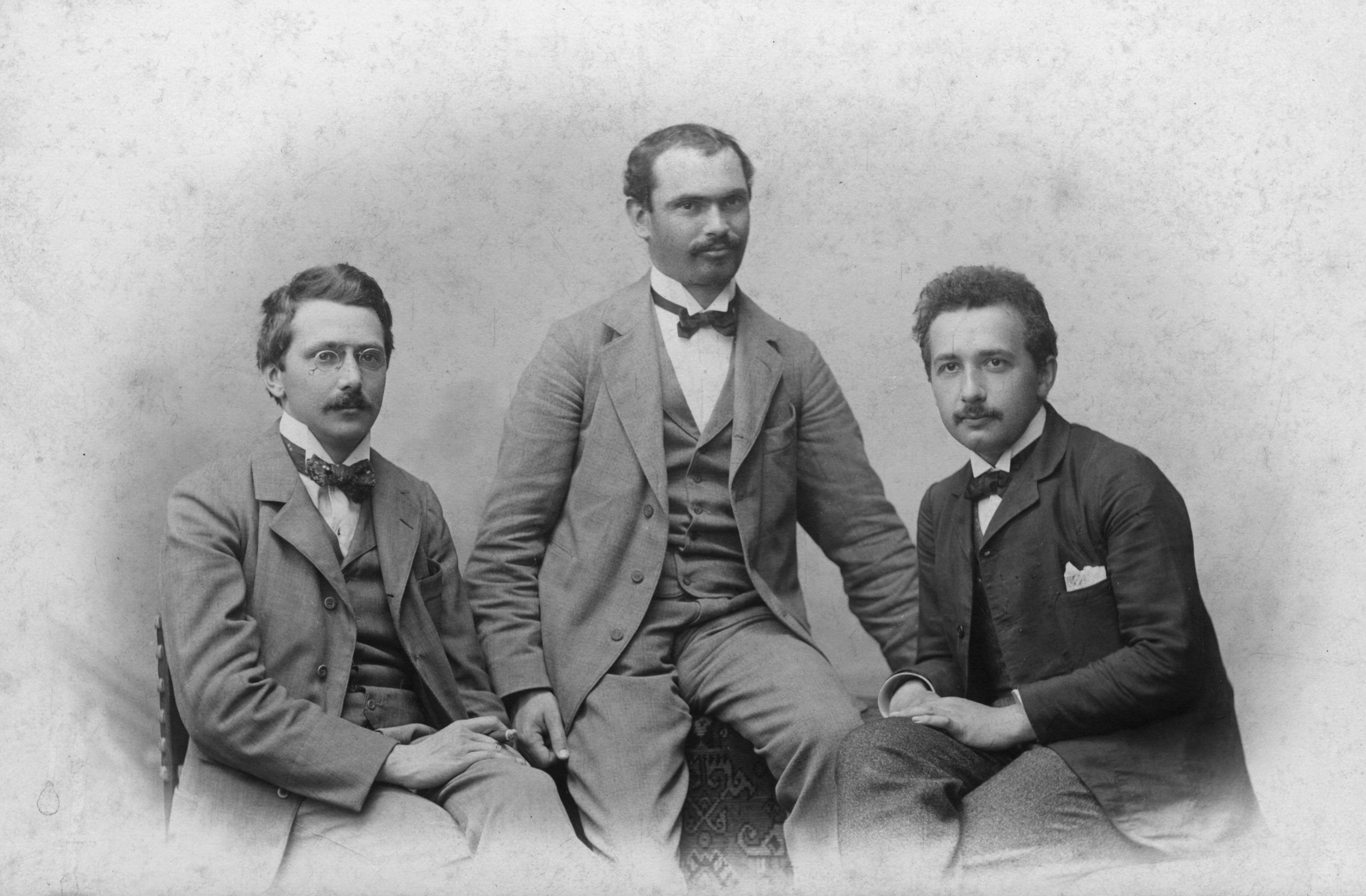
Members of the Olympia Academy: Conrad Habicht, Maurice Solovine, and Albert Einstein

Conrad Habicht (28 December 1876 in Schaffhausen – 23 October 1958 in Schaffhausen) was a Swiss mathematician and close personal friend of Albert Einstein.

== Association with Einstein ==
Together with Maurice Solovine, the three founded the Olympia Academy, an informal circle of friends who met together in Bern from 1902 to 1904 to discuss physics and philosophy.

Habicht and Solovine were the only two witnesses to Einstein's 1903 wedding to Mileva Marić.

Habicht was the recipient of Einstein's 1905 letter in which Einstein described his Annus mirabilis papers. Habich also received Einstein's letter about quanta.

Einstein and Solovine lost contact with Habicht but regained contact in 1947.

A book of letters between Einstein and Habicht in German Language was published in 2000.

== Early life ==
Habicht came from a middle class family in Schaffhausen and grew up there with four brothers and sisters. Son of Johann Conrad Habicht, merchant, and Susanna Elisabetha Oechslin, from Schaffhausen. In 1913 he married Anna Margarethe Kehlstadt, teacher, from Basel. He studied mathematics and physics in Zurich, Munich and Berlin, earning a doctors degree in 1903 at Bern, writing a dissertation on series of circles by Steiner. He studied violin.

Conrad's brother Paul was active in early development of automobile engines and had many Swiss patents.

== University and school teacher ==
Habicht taught university master's level mathematics and physics 11 years at Schiers in the Canton of the Graubünden where he also played violin. Then he taught mathematics and physics 33 years at Schaffhausen Canton high school, retiring in 1948.

Habicht and Einstein invented a meter for measuring very small electric potentials in millivolts with Conrad's brother Paul.

Einstein wrote to Habicht about his first attempt to explain the perihelion advance of Mercury.

Habicht wrote and published a book in Swiss German, biography of Gustav Kugler 1874-1939 a Rector of the Schaffhausen Canton school. He also published 5 editions of his mathematics in addition to his dissertation. Between 1943 and 1947 Habicht published another 6 books in 10 editions about the Swiss view of the world around them. He also published an education article about technical supervision of students. Habicht only published in Swiss German language.

== Manuscript on relativity (1914) ==
Habicht's papers at the ETH-Bibliothek in Zürich include an untitled manuscript on Einstein's principle of relativity, dated 1914 and catalogued as worked out by Habicht (shelf mark Hs 1457:2). It was made available online in December 2024. The text is a pedagogical exposition of special relativity. It begins with the classical principle of relativity and the ether problem, discussing the Fizeau experiment, the Michelson–Morley experiment and Lorentz's contraction hypothesis. It then derives the Lorentz transformation and closes with Minkowski's four-dimensional formulation and the inertia of energy. According to physicist Hector Giacomini, its Lorentz-centred structure follows Einstein's 1907 review article in the Jahrbuch der Radioaktivität und Elektronik more closely than the 1905 paper "On the Electrodynamics of Moving Bodies". Giacomini therefore sees it as a rare document of how the theory was understood within Einstein's close circle from the Bern years.

== Later life ==
Habicht was in retirement from teaching ten years, continuing to direct a local music academy until 1958. He died four years later after injury in an accident, survived by his wife, four children and ten grandchildren.

== Literature ==
- "Habicht, Conrad" in German, French and Italian in the online Historical Dictionary of Switzerland. Author: Thomas Franz Schneider
- Jürgen Neffe: Einstein. Eine Biografie. Rowohlt, Reinbek bei Hamburg 2006.
- Maurice Solovine: Freundschaft mit Albert Einstein. In: Physikalische Blätter 15 (1959), 3, S. 97–103.
- Albert Einstein: Eine neue elektrostatische Methode zur Messung kleinster Elektrizitätsmengen. In: Physikalische Zeitschrift 7 (1908), S. 216–217.
