= Wilhelm Stein =

German engineer

Only known photo of Stein, taken some point before his execution.

Wilhelm Stein (May 15, 1895 – June 16, 1944) was a German engineer, a Jewish resistance fighter, and Holocaust victim.

== Life ==
Stein was born in modern-day Sankt Goar. Despite only receiving an elementary school education, Stein managed to secure an enrollment in an engineering establishment, and following his graduation was gainfully employed by the lucrative Krupp family. It was here that Stein encountered the Bästlein-Jacob-Abshagen Group, and subsequently began aiding in their efforts in illegally working against the Nazi regime. Eventually, the Gestapo became aware of Stein's involvement and interred him first at Fuhlsbüttel Gestapo prison and then in Hamburg's Holstenglacis Remand Prison. The local Volksgerichtshof chapter adamantly opposed Stein and he was swiftly convicted, and executed in the summer of 1944, just nine months before Germany would surrender to the Allied Powers.

Today Stein is remembered by a street dedicated to his name in Hamburg, and in several works by Gunter Demnig. There exists a Stolperstein dedicated to Stein on Seevestraße in Hamburg.

== Literature ==
- The Persecution and Murder of the Jews of Hamburg 1933 - 1945: History, Testimony, Remembrance / Institute for the History of the German Jews', Hamburg 2006, ISBN 3-929728-85-0
- The Bästlein-Jacob-Abshagen group. Report on the anti-fascist resistance in Hamburg and on the water's edge during the Second World War. Dietz, Berlin, capital of the GDR 1959, pp. 216f.
