= Einsteinhaus =

Museum and former residence of Albert Einstein

Coordinates: 46.94767°N 7.44997°E

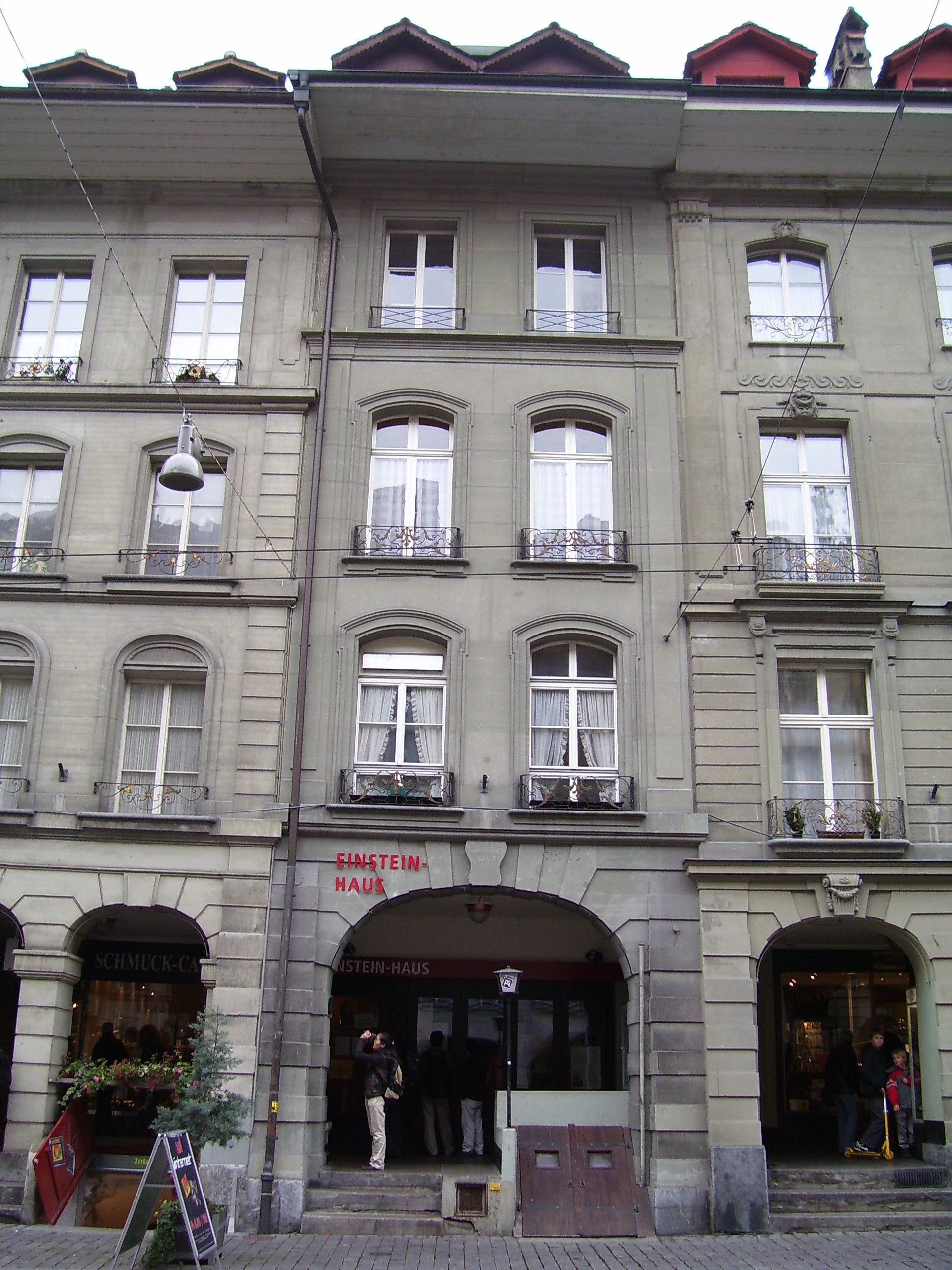
Façade

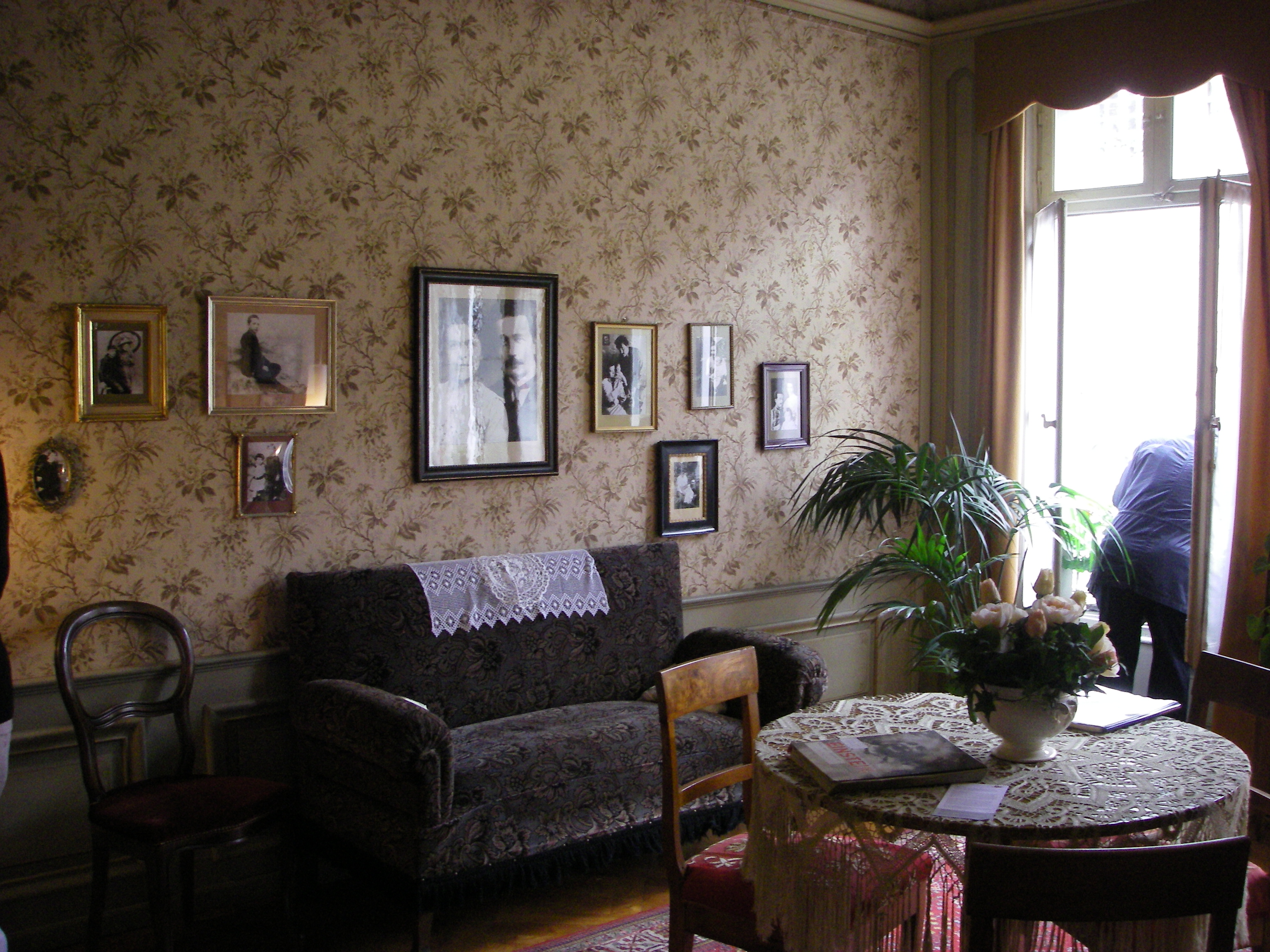
The living room

The Einsteinhaus (Einstein House) is a museum and a former residence of Albert Einstein. It is located on Kramgasse No. 49 in Bern, Switzerland. A flat on the second floor of the house was occupied by Einstein, his wife Mileva Marić, and their son Hans Einstein from 1903 to 1905. The Annus Mirabilis papers, which presented Einstein's theory of relativity and contributed substantially to the foundation of modern physics, were written here and published in the Annalen der Physik. During this time Einstein worked at the Federal Institute of Intellectual Property.

The living conditions of Einstein and his family are shown accurately in the apartment on the second floor with furniture from that time. Einstein's biography and his life's work are presented on the third floor.

A smaller permanent exhibition is located at the Historical Museum of Bern.

== See also ==
- List of museums in Bern
- List of museums in Switzerland
