= Münstergasse =

Street in the Old City of Bern

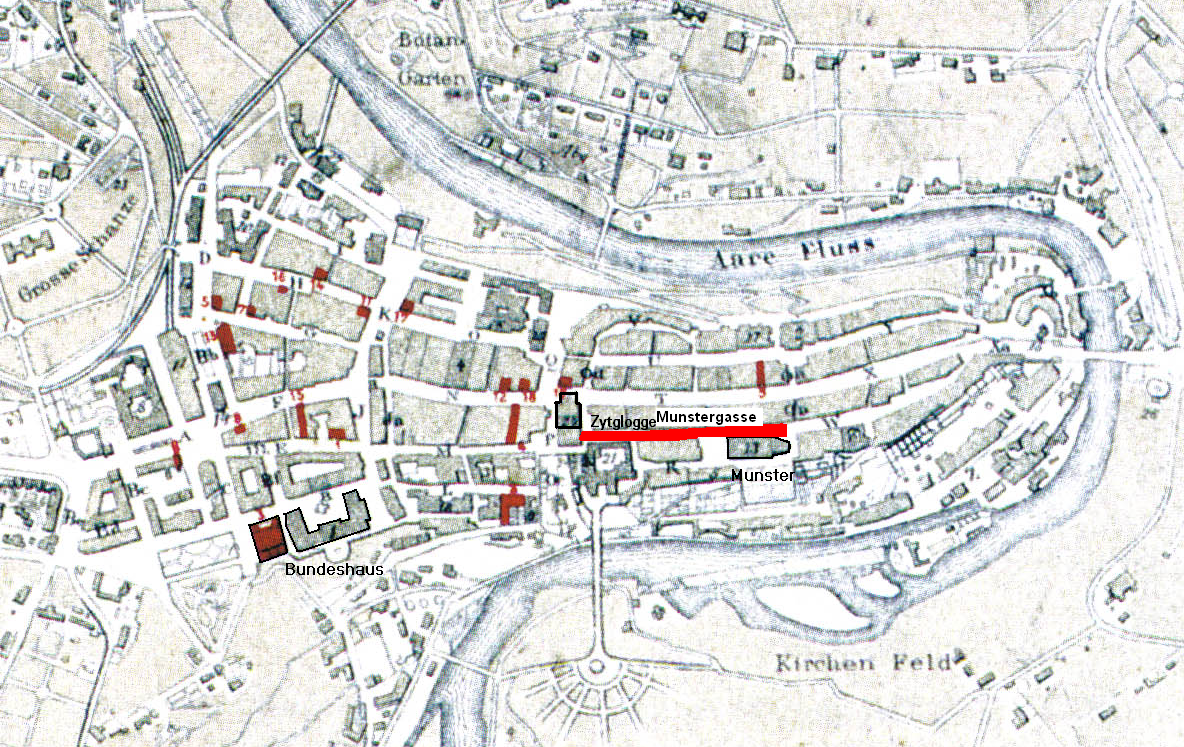
- Old City of Bern with Münstergasse highlighted
- Length: 300 m (980 ft)
- Location: Old City of Bern, Bern, Switzerland
- Postal code: 3011
- Coordinates: 46°56′50.92″N 7°27′7.83″E

Construction
- Inauguration: 1 November 1967

The Münstergasse is one of the streets in the Old City of Bern, the medieval city center of Bern, Switzerland. It is part of the Zähringerstadt which was built during the foundation of the old city in 1191. However, until 1967 it was parts of several other streets. It runs along the cathedral and it is part of the UNESCO Cultural World Heritage Site that encompasses the Old City.

== History ==
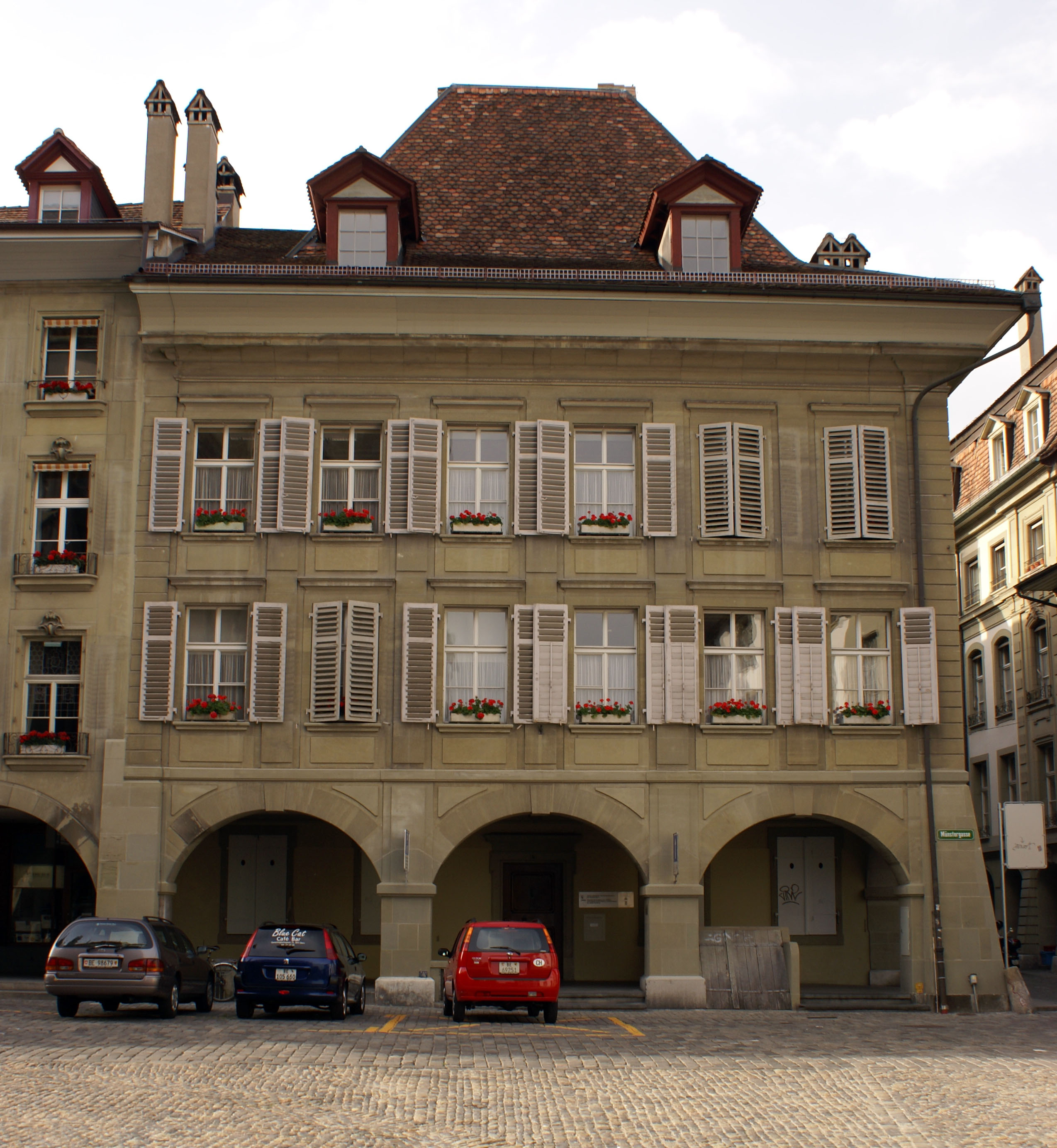
Münstergasse 2, seat of the cantonal Department of Justice and Police

On 1 November 1967 the Münstergasse was created from several other streets. Portions of Kesslergasse (Nr. 34–78 and 31–61), the northern section of Münsterplatz (Nr. 26–32) and the Kirchgasse (Nr. 2-24) were merged into Münstergasse. A university library is situated in Number 61.

Kesslergasse was first mentioned in 1576 as the new name of the western portion of Kirchgasse. The westernmost section, between Finstergässchen and Hotelgasse, was known as Vor den Barfüssern around 1600 and in the 19th century was known as Bei der Ankenwaag or Ankenlaube or Salzlaube. Kesslergasse was the fur processing marketplace in the 15th century. In 1514 it became the butter market and in 1778 it became the butchers' market.

Münsterplatz came into existence in 1430 when the church yard of St. Vinzenzen's Church was demolished to make way for a grand plaza in front of the new cathedral. At some time before 1506, two houses on Herrengasse were demolished to allow the plaza to expand westward. It expanded again, at some time before 1528, when three houses in what would become Münstergasse were demolished. The name Münsterplatz was commonly used in the 19th century and became official in 1881.

Kirchgasse was the original name for a both Junkerngasse and a portion of Münstergasse. In 1576 the name was only applied to the section that ran past the cathedral, as the Junkerngasse section had been renamed Edle Gasse ("Noble Lane") and would become Junkerngasse in the 17th century. In 1967 the name became unofficial when it was renamed to be part of Münstergasse.
