= Maurice Solovine =

Romanian philosopher and mathematician

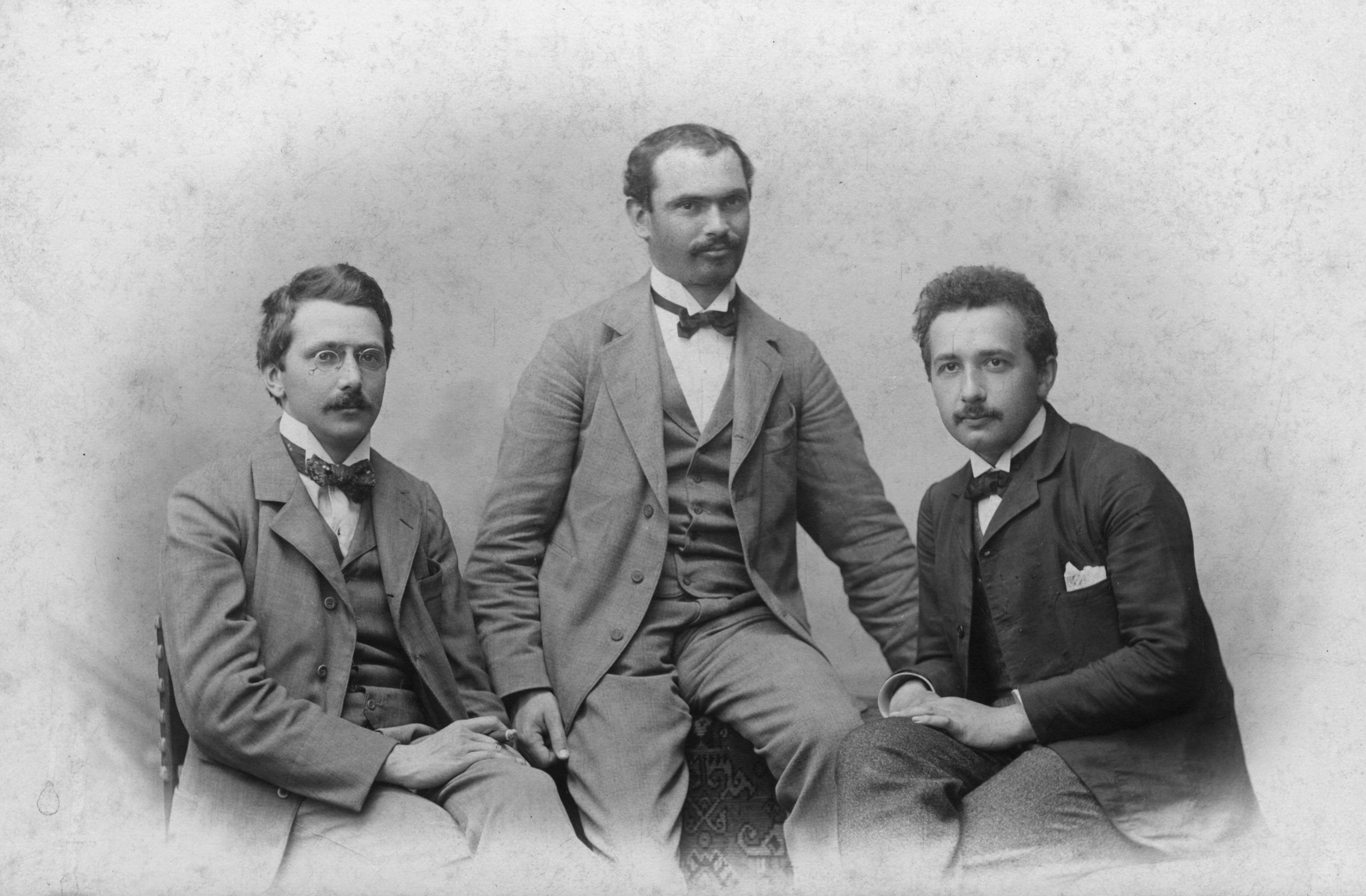
Olympia Academy members (l-r) Conrad Habicht, Solovine, and Albert Einstein

Maurice Solovine (21 May 1875 – 13 February 1958) was a Romanian philosopher and mathematician. He is best known for his association with Albert Einstein.

== Biography ==
Solovine was born in Iași, a university city in eastern Romania, near the border with Moldova. As a young student of philosophy in Bern, Solovine applied to study physics with Albert Einstein in response to an advertisement. The two men struck up a close relationship and Einstein was said to say to Solovine a few days after meeting him: "It is not necessary to give you lessons in physics. The discussion about the problems which we face in physics today is much more interesting; simply come to me when you wish. I am pleased to be able to talk to you."

One day Solovine suggested reading and debating the works of great authors. Einstein agreed enthusiastically and soon mathematician Conrad Habicht (1876–1958) became involved in what was to be known as the "Akademie Olympia" (Olympia Academy). Often their meetings, held in Einstein's flat, would last until the early morning hours.

On one occasion Solovine missed a scheduled meeting in his flat, preferring to listen to a concert in the city. He had prepared a meal for his friends with a note: "Amicis carissimis ova dura et salutem." (To my beloved friends, hard-boiled eggs and greetings). Einstein and Habicht turned his flat upside down after they had eaten the meal. Every piece of furniture was moved and plates, cups, forks, knives and books were scattered all over the flat. The rooms were also covered in smoke from Einstein's pipe and Habicht's cigar. They left a "worthy warning" on the wall: "Amico carissimo fumum spissum et salutem." (To our dearest friend, thick smoke and greetings). Einstein is reputed to have greeted Solovine the next evening with the following words: "You lousy guy, you were cheeky enough to stay away from a meeting of the Akademie to listen to the violin? Barbarian, idiot, stupid one, if you ever let us down this way again you’ll be expelled from the Akademie with shame." This meeting lasted until the morning to make up for lost time.

From November 1905, Solovine continued his studies in Lyon. He then moved to Paris, where he helped publish the Revue philosophique between 1908 and 1919 and worked as a freelance translator and editor of classic texts on the history of European philosophy and of contemporary mathematicians. He was the principal translator of works by Einstein from German to French and represented Einstein's financial interest and agreements with publishers in France, for which Einstein paid him a percentage fee. Solovine remained in contact with Einstein with letters dated from 3 May 1906 to 27 February 1955.

Solovine published French translations of Greek philosophers. He died in Paris in 1958.
