= Albert Lindegger =

Weiblicher Akt am Strand (Female Nude on Beach)
- Artist: Albert Lindegger
- Year: 1952
- Medium: Oil on canvas
- Dimensions: 64.5 cm × 81 cm (25.4 in × 31.9 in)

Albert Lindegger or Lindi (14 September 1904 – 14 October 1991) was a Swiss painter and illustrator. He is best known as a political satirist.

== Biography ==
Born in Bern, he studied art in Paris, at the Académie André Lhote. In 1934 he adopted the artist name "Lindi", and exhibited in the Kunsthalle Bern. By the 1930s he had established himself as a caricaturist, and travelled widely through Europe, visiting Spain and Turkey, as well as Madagascar and countries in Northern Africa. Through the years of World War II, Lindegger continued to draw caricatures, often critical of the German Nazi regime, but also illustrated books such as Émile Zola's Nana and Guy de Maupassant's Bel Ami and Une vie.

After the war he continued to contribute illustrations to magazines, and worked for the publications Die Weltwoche in Basel and National-Zeitung and Der Bund in Bern. He was often employed to produce illustrations from international events such as the 1948 Winter Olympics in St. Moritz. Lindegger exhibited at various galleries and exhibitions over the years, such as the Kunstmuseum in Lucerne, the Landweer Gallery in Amsterdam, and in 1927 at the prestigious Paris Salon d'Automne. He was also responsible for murals at the headquarters of the cantonal police, and at the crematorium in Bern.

His drawings are characteristically black-and-white line-drawings, often with humorous, anthropomorphic motifs. Though best known for his illustrations, Lindegger also produced sculptures, and erotic drawings of high artistic value, frequently as illustrations to self-written books. In addition to this he was also a filmmaker, and had to his credit the movies Flug in den Hoggar (1948) and Madagaskar (1951).

Lindegger married Marianne Murkowsky in 1906. Together they had the sons Marc Albert in 1962, and Renè in 1965, who died in an accident in 1984. Albert Lindegger died at the hospital San Giovanni in Bellinzona in 1991.
