= Bern Historical Museum =

Second largest historical museum in Switzerland

- German: Bernisches Historisches Museum; French: Musée d'Histoire de Berne
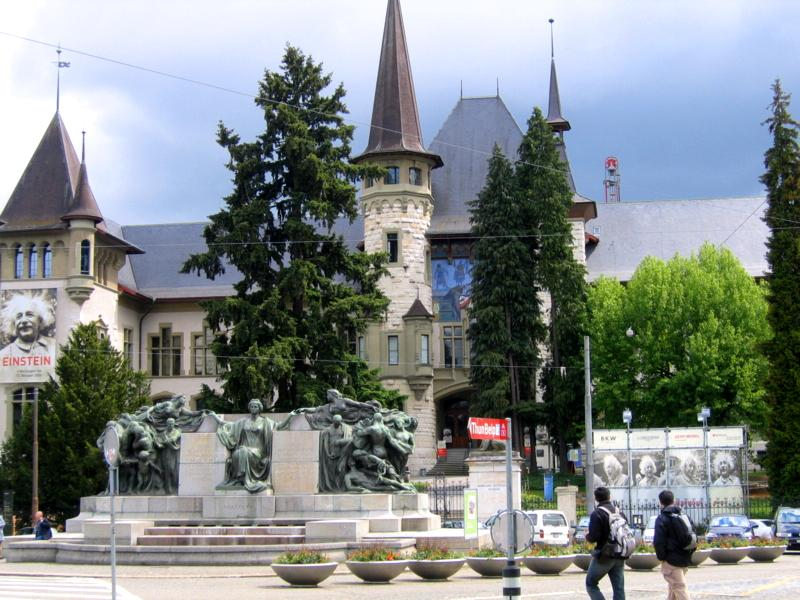
- The Museum entrance on Helvetiaplatz

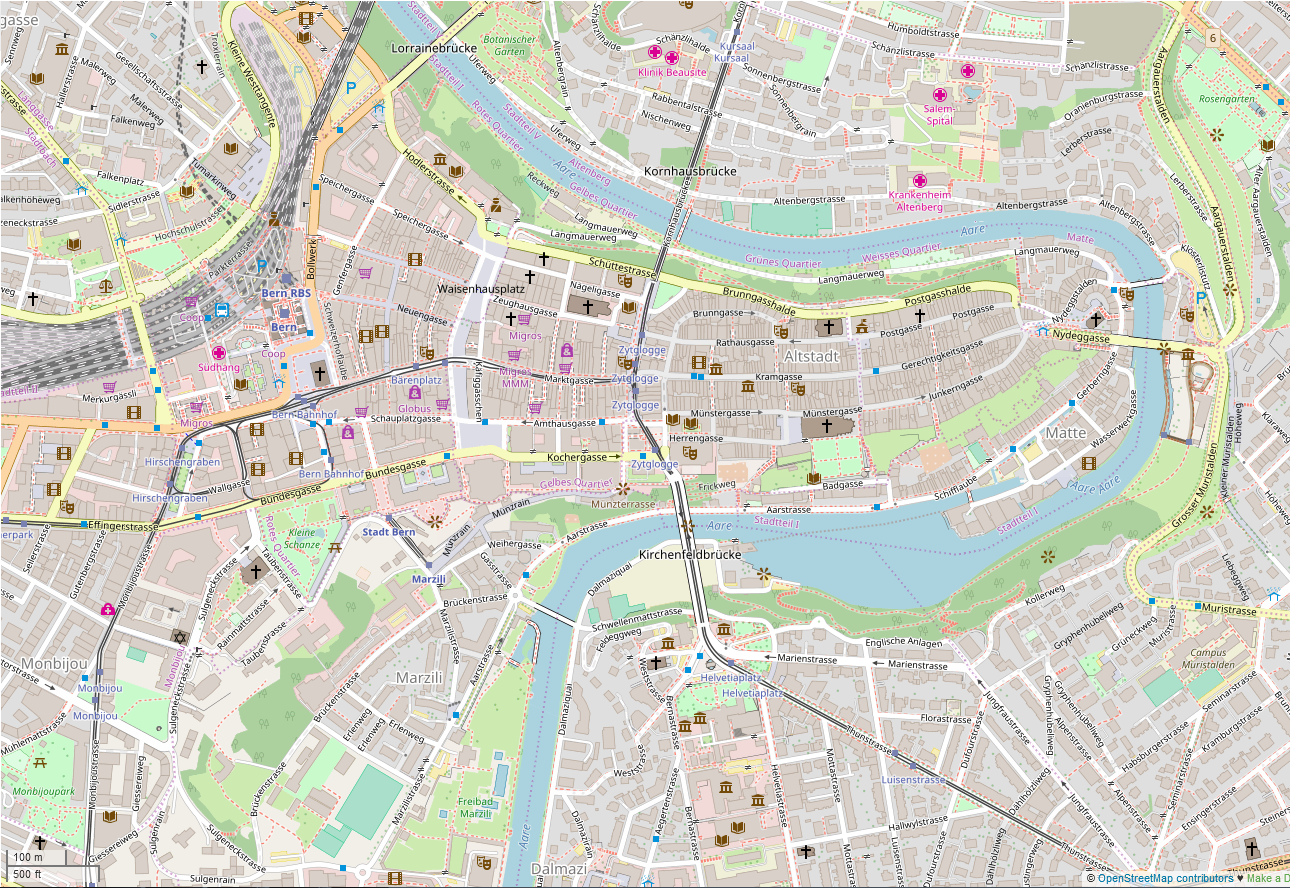
- Location within Bern Location within Canton of Bern Location within Switzerland
- Established: 1894
- Location: Helvetiaplatz, Bern, Switzerland
- Coordinates: 46°56′35″N 7°26′57″E
- Type: History
- Collection size: 500,000
- Director: Jakob Messerli
- Architect: André Lambert
- Website: www.bhm.ch

Swiss Cultural Property of National Significance

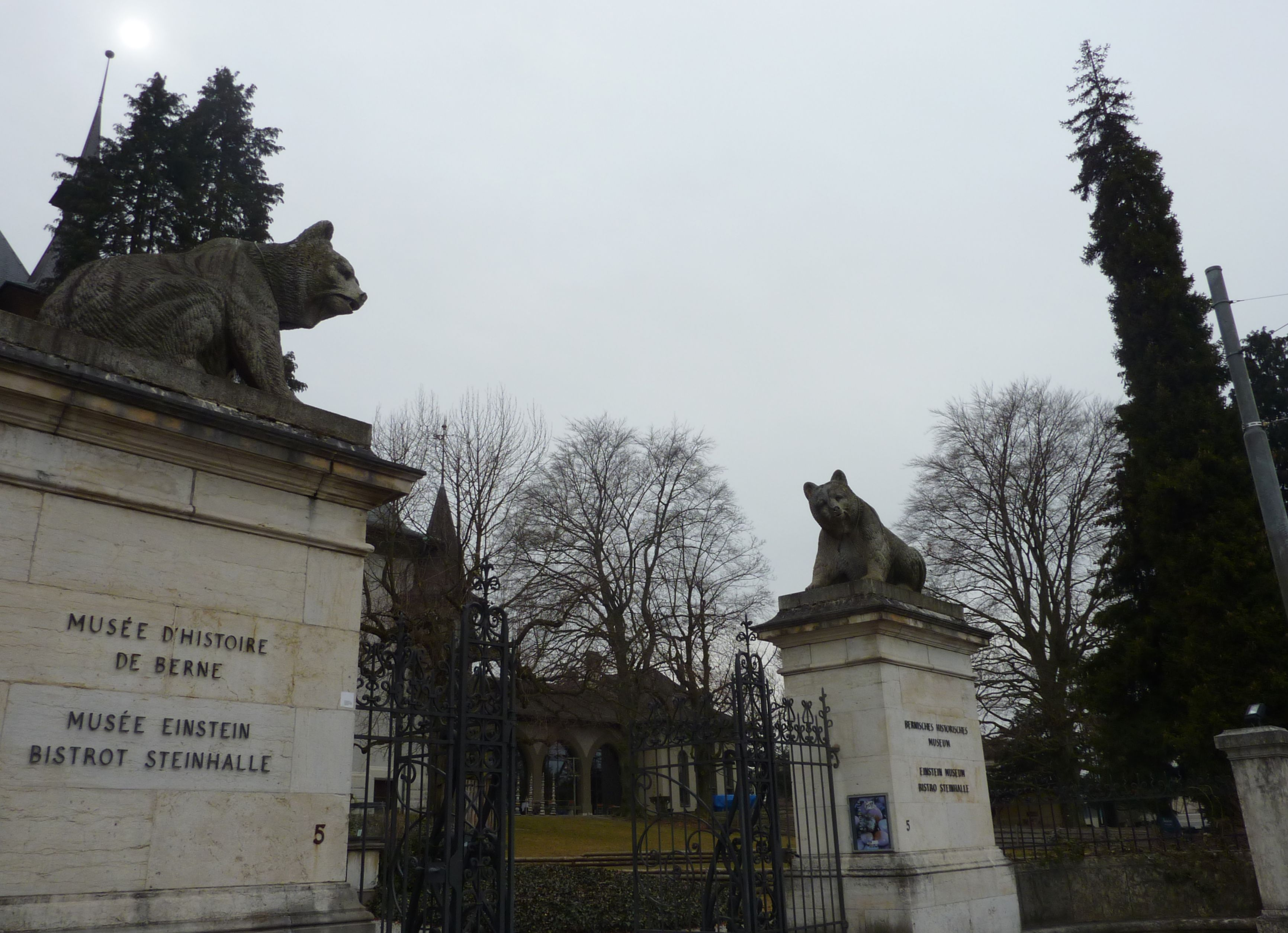
Bern Historical Museum entrance gates

The Bern Historical Museum (German: Bernisches Historisches Museum, French: Musée d'Histoire de Berne) is the second largest historical museum in Switzerland. It was designed by the Neuchâtel architect André Lambert and built in 1894. Since it was initially conceived as the Swiss National Museum (which the city of Zurich was later chosen to host), the architect took as his model various historic castles from the 15th and 16th centuries. An extension to the original museum building was completed in 2009.

== Collections ==
The museum contains collections related to the history of Bern from prehistoric times to the present and other artefacts on permanent display from Asia, Oceania, America and Egypt. The collection includes important tapestries and other loot from the camp of Duke Charles the Bold of Burgundy, taken after his defeat and death at the Battle of Nancy in 1477.

The Bern Historical Museum is a heritage site of national significance.

One of the most remarkable items in the collection is the Muri statuette group, a group of six Gallo-Roman bronze figurines, and the Moringen arrowhead, determined to be of meteoric origin in 2023 despite being in the collection for well over a century.

The museum is home to the mummified head of a man who lived in Egypt in the first or early second century BC.

Over the museum's entrance is a glass mosaic, "The Age of History", featuring the figures of Poetry and History, made in 1900 by the Swiss painter Léo-Paul Robert.

== Einstein Museum ==
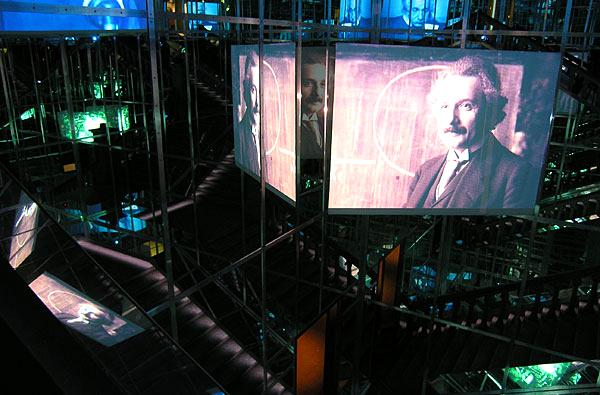
The Einstein Museum

First conceived as a temporary exhibition in 2005, the Einstein Museum became a museum dedicated to the life and work of Albert Einstein, who developed the Relativity Theory while living in Bern. The house where he lived (Einsteinhaus) in this period is also open to the public, but is located elsewhere in the city and charges separate entry fees.

== Multaka network ==
In 2019, the museum joined six similar museums in Germany, Italy, Greece and the United Kingdom, creating the international Multaka network. This intercultural museum project organizes guided tours for refugees and migrants designed and offered for free by specially trained Arabic-speaking Multaka guides. The visitor-centered discussions with migrants in their language are focused on the historical origin and history of acquisition of cultural objects, including the visitors' own understanding of their country's cultural heritage.

== See also ==
- List of museums in Bern
- List of museums in Switzerland
