= Nürnberg (disambiguation) =

Nuremberg (German: Nürnberg) is a city in Germany.

Nürnberg or Nuremberg may refer to:

== Places ==
- Norberčany, called Nürnberg in German
- Nuremberg Castle (Nürnberger Burg)
- Free Imperial City of Nuremberg (1306–1801), a State of the Holy Roman Empire
- Nuremberg, Pennsylvania, United States

== Law ==
- Nuremberg Code
- Nuremberg principles
- Nuremberg trials
- Superior orders, also known as "the Nuremberg defense"

== Nazism ==
- Nuremberg Laws (Nürnberger Gesetze)
- Nuremberg Rally (Reichsparteitag)

== Films ==
- The Nuremberg Trials (film), a 1947 Soviet documentary film
- Judgment at Nuremberg, a 1961 American drama film
- Nuremberg (miniseries), a 2000 Canadian-American television docudrama
- Nuremberg (2023 film), a Russian drama film
- Nuremberg (2025 film), an American drama film

== Ships ==
- SMS Nürnberg (1906)
- SMS Nürnberg (1916)
- German cruiser Nürnberg, World War II ship

== Others ==
- 1. FC Nürnberg, a Bundesliga football (soccer) club
- Nuremberg Chronicle, one of the best documented early printed books
- Nuremberg Files, a website that displayed information about doctors who performed abortions in the United States
- Nuremberg U-Bahn (U-Bahn Nürnberg), a metro run by VAG Nürnberg
- Albrecht von Nürnberg (fl. 1492–1531), German sculptor
- Herbert Nürnberg (1914–1995), German boxer
- M. J. Nurenberger (1911–2001), Jewish journalist, author and publisher

== See also ==
- Nirenberg, a surname
- Nürnberger (disambiguation)
