= The Canadian Jewish News =

Canadian Jewish newspaper

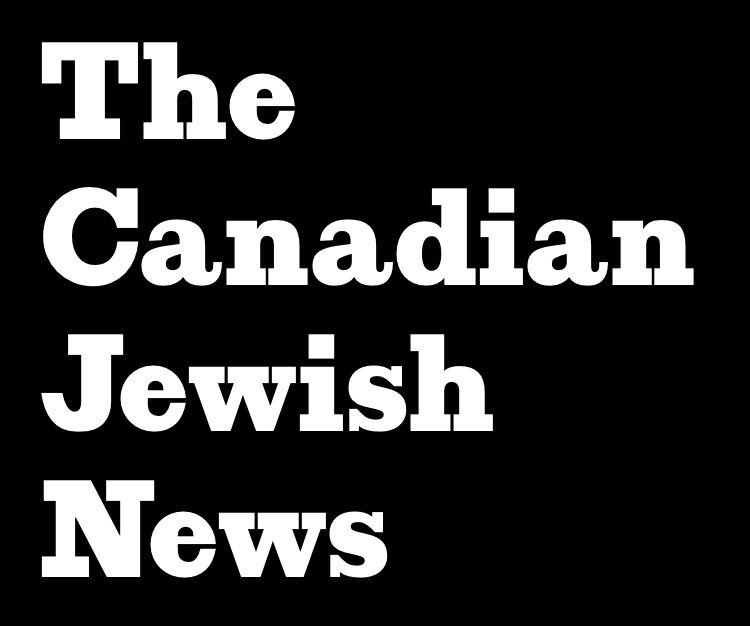
- Format: Digital-first with quarterly print magazine; formerly a weekly tabloid
- Owner: Non-profit Organization
- Founder(s): M. J. Nurenberger and Dorothy Nurenberger
- Publisher: Michael Weisdorf, CEO
- President: Bryan Borzykowski
- Founded: 1960 (reorganized 1971)
- Political alignment: Non-partisan
- Language: English and French
- Circulation: 60,000 (as of March 15, 2026)
- Price: Free
- Readership: 150,000/month
- Website: www.thecjn.ca

The Canadian Jewish News is a non-profit, national, English-language digital-first media organization that serves Canada's Jewish community. A national edition of the newspaper was published for 60 years in Toronto. A weekly Montreal edition in English with some French began its run in 1976. The newspaper announced its closure in 2013 but was able to continue after restructuring and reorganizing. It again announced its closure on April 2, 2020, due to the impact of the COVID-19 pandemic in Canada on its finances. Its final weekly print edition was published on April 9, 2020. In December 2020, it announced its return as a digital-first media company with a new president, Bryan Borzykowski.

== History ==
The Canadian Jewish News was founded by M. J. Nurenberger, a friend of Menachem Begin and supporter of his Herut party, and his wife Dorothy and was first published on Friday, January 1, 1960, and was the first exclusively English-language Jewish newspaper published in Ontario.

The CJN was considered a "provocative" paper into the 1970s but was later considered something of a "lapdog for the community". The CJN originally hewed a line that supported the right in Israeli politics and was critical of the liberal leadership of the Canadian Jewish community at the time as well as community institutions such as B'nai Brith and the United Jewish Appeal, the latter for its secrecy in how it dispersed money. According to his daughter, Atara Beck, "He believed that a newspaper should be a thorn in the side of the establishment."

In 1971, following the death of his wife, Nurenberger sold the newspaper for $30,000 to a group of community leaders that included Shoppers Drug Mart founder Murray Koffler and real estate developer Albert Latner and was led by philanthropist and businessman Ray Wolfe. Though independent, the newspaper has been owned, since 1971, by a group of Jewish leaders allied with what was then the Canadian Jewish Congress.

Nurenburger soon regretted his decision, discouraged by the new version of the paper's reticence to challenge the community's establishment, and started the Jewish Times in 1974, which was decidedly more right wing than The CJN under its new management, and continued publication into the early 1990s.

In 1979, The CJN adopted editorial guidelines that prevent articles from criticizing the state of Israel's security policies.

By 2013, it had a circulation of 40,000 copies per week.

=== First closure ===
On April 22, 2013, the newspaper issued termination notices to its 50 staff and announced that it will cease printing with its June 20 edition due to financial constraints. The publishers sought benefactors to provide funding that would allow The CJN to continue as an exclusively online publication less reliant on advertising.

=== Resumption of publication and second closure ===
On June 14, 2013, The CJN's board announced that it would resume publication of its print edition in August 2013 after moving to smaller offices and pending the results of a subscription and advertising drive and various changes to the newspaper's business model. Among others, editor Mordechai Ben-Dat and senior staffer and columnist Sheldon Kirshner were let go.

The newspaper was subsequently reorganized under new leadership, and with a drastically reduced staff, beginning in January 2014, with Elizabeth Wolfe, daughter of Ray Wolfe, becoming president and former Jerusalem Report, National Post and Maclean's journalist Yoni Goldstein becoming the newspaper's editor. Goldstein subsequently introduced a more diverse range of contributors to the newspaper. The content of the newly revamped paper was described as "racier" and was more reliant on freelancers.

By 2016, the newspaper's subscriptions remained mostly unchanged at 31,000, but Wolfe reported advertising and subscription revenues were enough to invest in new projects.

The paper announced that it would cease publication with its 9 April 2020 issue, with its final circulation estimated at 32,000. It had suffered from financial shortfalls for years, which were exacerbated by the impact of the coronavirus pandemic in Canada on its finances. The CJN's president Elizabeth Wolfe stated that "The CJN suffered from a pre-existing condition and has been felled by COVID-19."

=== Revival in digital form ===
In May 2021, The CJN resumed publication once again, for the first time without a physical weekly newspaper. Instead, it returned at a new website, thecjn.ca, which resumed its reporting tradition. The CJN also printed its first magazine for pre-existing subscribers in March 2021, which has since continued as a quarterly. At the end of 2023, longtime editor-in-chief Yoni Goldstein stepped down and was replaced by CEO Michael Weisdorf.

As part of the 2021 revival, The CJN launched an audio podcast network. The current list includes North Star, a daily newscast hosted by Ellin Bessner, author of Double Threat; Not in Heaven, hosted by Rabbi Avi Finegold; The Jewish Angle, hosted by Phoebe Maltz Bovy, a columnist with The Globe and Mail and the author of The Perils of "Privilege"; and Menschwarmers, about Jews and sports. Past podcast programs have been hosted by CBC veteran Ralph Benmergui, Conservative deputy leader Melissa Lantsman, Black Jewish activist Rivka Campbell, Palestinian peace activist Yafa Sakkejha, comedian Laura Leibow, and business journalist and author Jared Lindzon. In 2024, The CJN debuted its first original audio drama podcast, Justice: A Holocaust Zombie Story, about media narratives and generational trauma. The show was produced in association with the Ashkenaz Foundation. The CJN has produced several live podcast events with high-profile guests, including actress Jennifer Podemski, sports broadcaster Michael Landsberg, and comedians Adrienne Fish, Nour Hadidi, AJ Bate and Dan Rosen.

== Contributors ==
Notable contributors to the newspaper have included Jacob Elbaz and J. B. Salsberg, who was a featured columnist in the newspaper for several decades until his death in 1998; and Rabbi Gunther Plaut, who contributed a weekly column for many years. In its final print years, Bernie Farber and Barbara Kay were weekly columnists.

The main Toronto edition of The CJN had a rotating group of guest columnists: among them were academics Norma Baumel Joseph and Norman Ravvin of Concordia University; Sarah Horowitz of York; Gil Troy of McGill; Gerald Steinberg of Bar-Ilan University, as well as Jean Gerber in Vancouver, and Rabbi Dow Marmur and Avrum Rosensweig in Toronto.

== See also ==
- Canadian Jewish Review
- List of newspapers in Canada
