= Nürnberger =

Nürnberger may refer to:

== Places near Nuremberg, Germany ==
- Nürnberger Land, a district in Bavaria, Germany
- Nürnberger Burg or Nuremberg Castle
- Nürnberger Reichswald, the location of Nuremberg Zoo

== Other uses ==
- Albert Nürnberger (1854–1931), German bow maker
- L. C. Nuernberger (1879–1951), American politician from Nebraska
- M. J. Nurenberger (1911–2001), Jewish journalist, author and publisher
- Nürnberger Nachrichten (NN), a local daily in the Nuremberg-Erlangen-Fürth area
- Nürnberger Rostbratwurst, a type of small Bratwurst (fried sausage) originating from Nürnberg.

== See also ==
- Nürnberg (disambiguation)
