= Zeitglockenturm =

Zeitglockenturm can refer to

- the Zytglogge tower in Bern, Switzerland
- the Zeitglockenturm in Solothurn, Switzerland
