= Käfigturm =

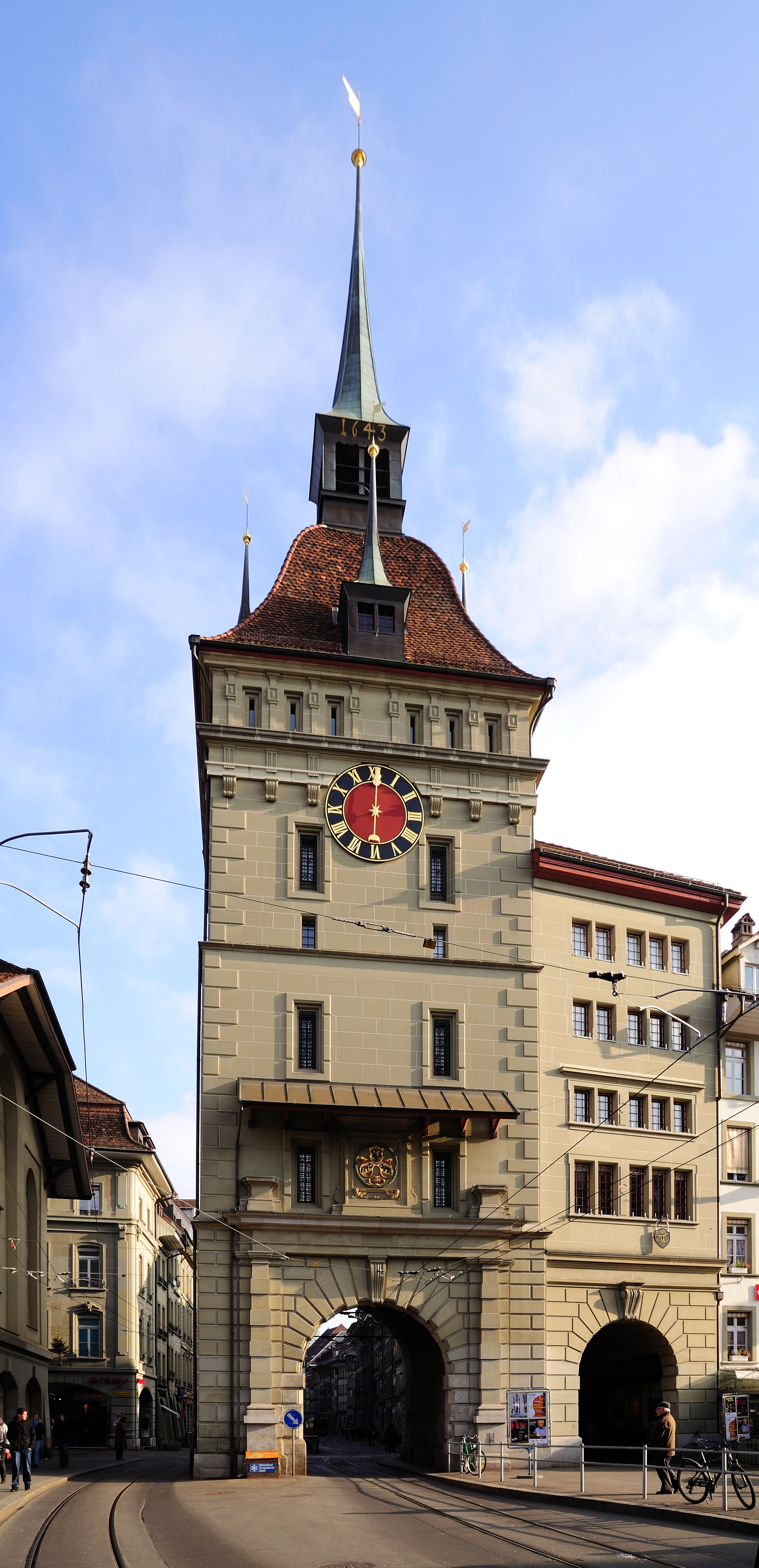
- West side of the Käfigturm from Waisenhausplatz.

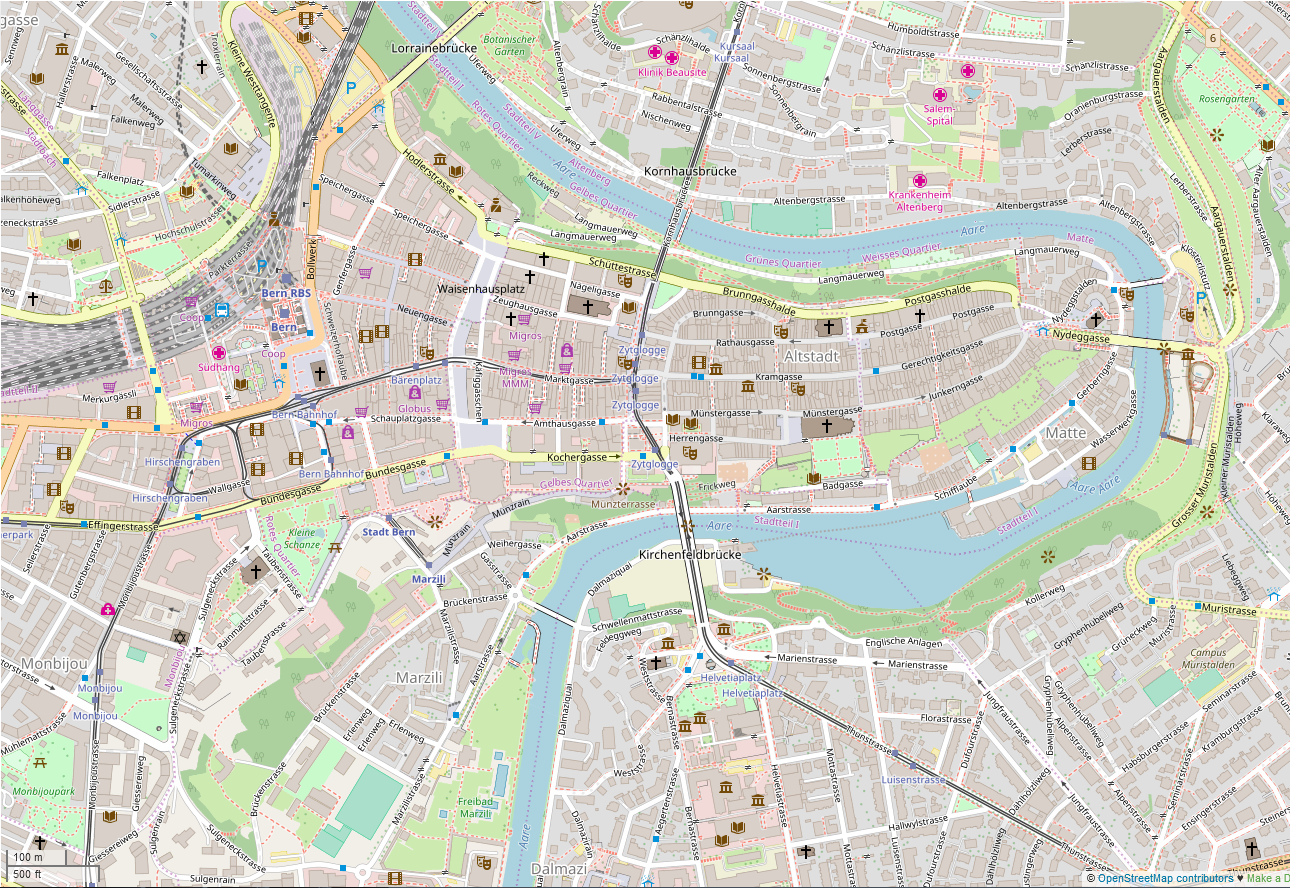
- Location within Bern Location within Canton of Bern Location within Switzerland
- 46.94816°N 7.44394°E
- Location: Old City of Bern

History
- Built: 1256
- Demolished: 1640
- Rebuilt: 1641-44

Site notes
- Height: 49 m (161 ft)
- Architectural style: Early Baroque
- Governing body: City of Bern

UNESCO World Heritage Site
- Part of: Old City of Bern world heritage site

Swiss Cultural Property of National Significance

The Käfigturm is a Baroque tower in Bern, Switzerland. It is part of the UNESCO Cultural World Heritage Site of the Old City of Bern and the tower is a Cultural Property of National Significance. The original tower was built as a gate house during the second expansion of Bern in 1256. The tower was demolished in 1640 and completely rebuilt immediately thereafter.

== History ==
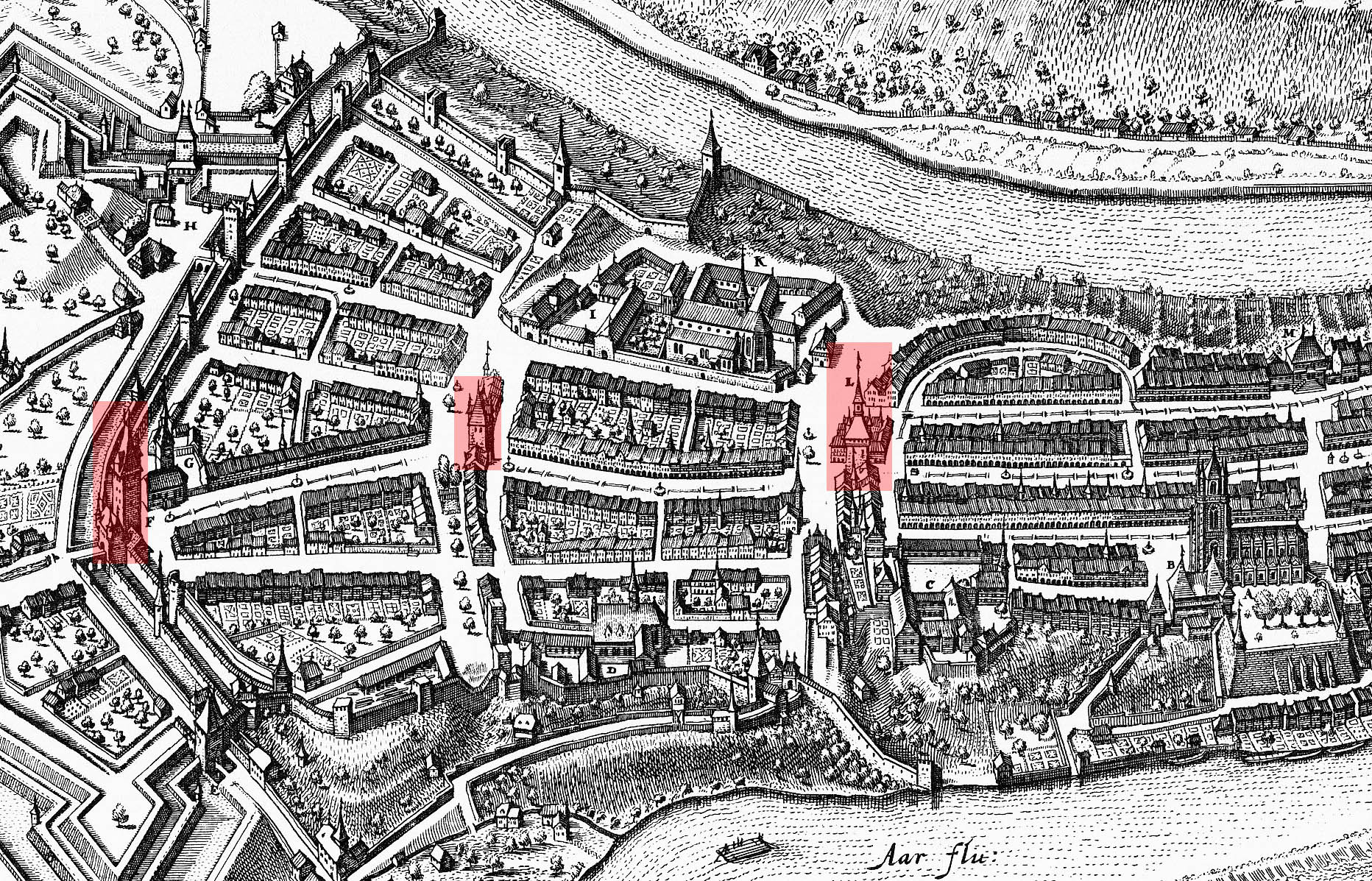
Map of Bern's three medieval guard towers, from left to right: Christoffelturm (now destroyed), Käfigturm, Zytglogge

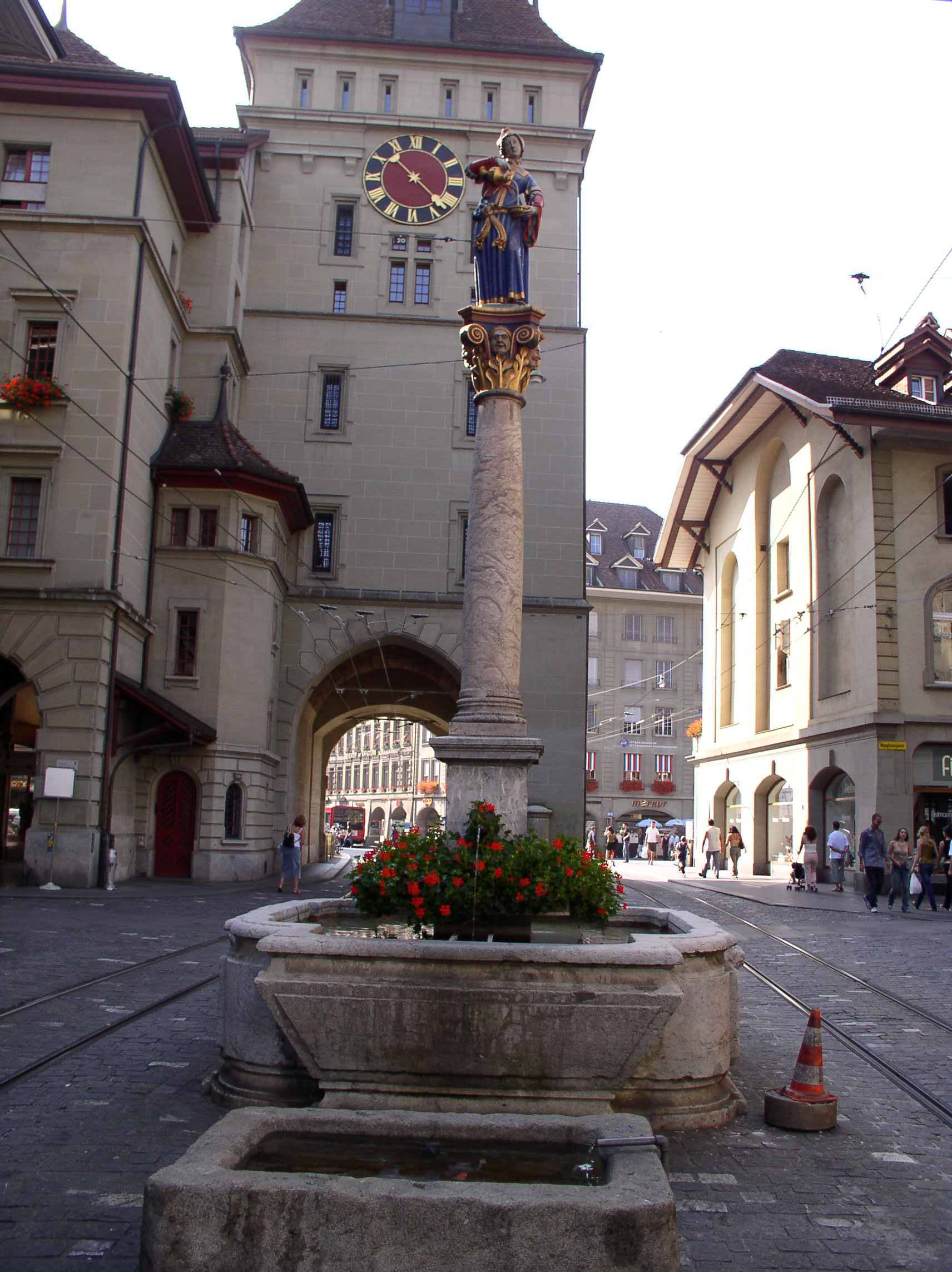
East side of the Käfigturm with Anna Seiler fountain

The first tower, which stood on the site of the present Käfigturm, was built in 1256 during the second expansion of Bern. Over the nearly seventy years since the construction of the Zytglogge tower and the first city walls, Bern had expanded westward along the Aare peninsula. In 1255, construction began on a second set of walls, which required a new gatehouse. The new tower was very similar to the original Zytglogge. It was built as a hollow square and most of the back of the tower was open to the city. It had a small, flat platform at the top and a gate that opened onto the bridge over the moat.

Following the third city expansion in 1345, the tower became a second line of defense. In 1405, a fire destroyed most of the city of Bern. After the fire, the town's prison was moved from the Zytglogge tower west to the Käfigturm, which was then known as the nüwe kefyen. The name was quickly shortened to kebie, from which the name Käfigturm (literally cage or jail tower) came. After the armory tower was converted into a women's prison, the Käfigturm was known as Mannenkefi. By 1433, the tower was also serving as a watch and signal tower in addition to a prison. By 1470, it had been modified with niches on the city side and merlons around the top platform. At some point between 1470 and 1549, a hip roof was added to the top of the tower. According to a drawing by Gregorius Sickinger, the original tower stood about 3.8 meters (12 ft) east of its current location.

On 19 May 1638, a commission was appointed by the city council to replace the dilapidated Mannerkefi tower. The old tower was demolished in 1640 and on 29 May 1641, the town council approved plans to build a new tower which would stand slightly to the west of the old tower. In April 1642, one of the chief builders, Joseph Plepp, died. The other chief builder, Antoni Graber, took full control of the project. On 20 January 1643, the exterior work was complete and Graber handed the project over to master carpenter Hans Stähli to finish the roof and the interior woodwork. By the spring of 1644, most of the interior work was finished.

During the planning phase, the commission determined that the new Käfigturm would not be large enough to close the several prisons around Bern and move them all into the new tower. In February 1641, the town council acquired the house of the recently deceased widow of Hans Gunier, which lay just south of the new tower. The house was rebuilt from the ground up as part of the prison by Antoni Graber. Once Graber finished the exterior work on the house, the interior was built in 1643/44 by Niclaus Bovet.

During the winter of 1690-91, the first modifications were made to the tower. A clock face was added on the front and back of the middle of the tower. The decorative Corbels and triglyphs and a window in the middle section of the tower were all removed to add the clock.

The current clock tower bell was added to the tower in 1643. The history of the bell is a bit unusual. When the town decided to add a bell, the Thirty Years War was still raging in Europe. Due to the war, it was very difficult to buy metal to cast a bell. So, the town council chose to buy a bell that had been captured near Vesoul and was being shipped as war booty to Freiburg.

Until the end of the 17th Century, the bell was struck by hand. The mechanism to ring the bells automatically was installed in 1691-92.

The tower remained virtually unchanged over the following centuries, though the attached house was renovated and gained two additional stories between 1794 and 1805. In 1903 and 1933 the west facade of the tower was renovated. The east facade was renovated in 1906. To ease traffic congestion, a second walkway was cut through the house north of the tower in 1886. Then, in 1902-3 a large gate was built through the ground floor cell block of the prison. The 60 to 70 prisoners that had been housed in the tower, were moved to the district prison north of the main post office building in 1897. Removing the prisoners and demolishing the cells changed the role of the tower. It became an archive tower and stored the state archives of the canton and the records of the supreme court. For a time a portion of the basement served as a warehouse of the adjacent Garnier wine shop.

After minor renovations in 1906 on the east facade and on the west facade in 1933, in 1976 the Grand Council of the Canton of Bern approved a total renovation. The renovation included an expansion into an information and exhibition center. The information center finally opened on 19 April 1980 and remained open for the next 15 years. After the information center closed it was temporarily used as a commercial library and sporadically hosted exhibitions, private parties or meetings. Eventually, the federal government established the tower as a meeting place for the Polit-Forum (Political Forum of the Confederation) an organization of people who were interested in discussing politics.

== Tower site ==
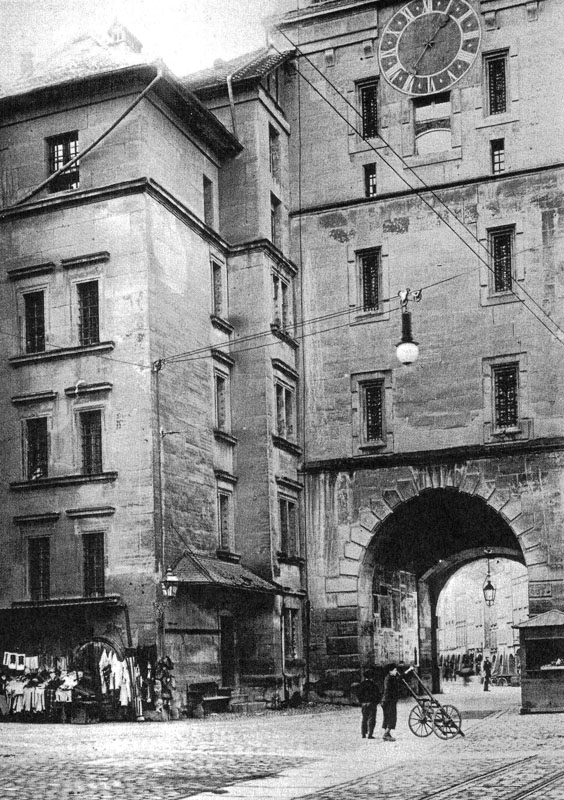
East side of the Käfigturm, before the portal was driven through the neighboring building and with the rectangular stair house.

The tower is a square with 9.8 m (32 ft) sides. The portal through the tower is 5 m (16 ft) and the base is 2.5 m (8.2 ft) thick. The bottom of the roof is 23.2 m (76 ft) above the street, and the pennant at the top of the tower is 49 m (161 ft) high. Most of the tower is built out of sandstone. The roof features five early baroque towers. The four smaller towers are exact copies of each other and are placed at the centers of the four sides of the tower. The central tower is larger, but retains all the features of the four smaller towers. They all feature a pair of rectangular windows, a copper-plated pointed roof and a pennant. The clock works are built into the attic floor of the tower.

On the east side, in the corner of the 1641 neighboring building and the tower, is a three sided stair house which was built in 1903.

The neighboring building is four stories tall above a round top portal. The current appearance of this prison building comes from 1805–06, except for the portal which was run through the old ground floor prison in 1903.
