= Jacob Elbaz =

Photographer

Jacob El-Baz (El Baz) (Hebrew: יעקב אלבז; born 1945) is a photojournalist, art photographer, and gallery owner.

== Life and work ==
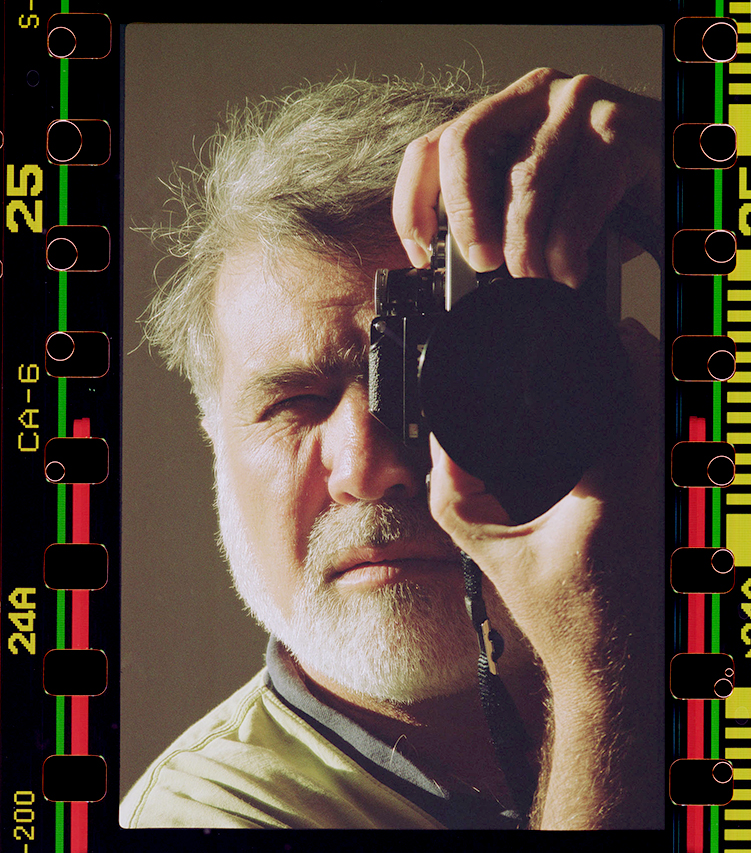
Elbaz

El-Baz spent his early life on Kibbutz Sde Nehemia in the northern Galilee and his photography career began there. His photograph of the flooding of the Jordan River in 1963 was used on the front cover of "Yediot Aharonot", along with another two of his pictures. He moved to Jerusalem to be a freelance photojournalist, taking photographs of celebrities such as Marc Chagall, Teddy Kolek, Moshe Dayan, and Golda Meir. His pictures of poor Moroccan Jews in Haifa gained exposure for their living conditions and plans were made to improve the housing situation. Elbaz has taken photographs of the terrorist attack of the bus on the children of Avivim, the Yom Kippur War, negotiations of the cease-fire with the Egyptians at Km 101, the Litani Operation, the Jewish/Arab tension and the friction between the Hasidic and African American communities in Crown Heights, Brooklyn.

Elbaz first moved to Toronto to work as a freelance photographer for the paper Canadian Jewish News. Elbaz won first prize in a photography competition with the subject "Israel" in the Jewish Chronicle with a photograph called "Torah and Peace".

He became an art dealer and eventually opened two art galleries in Toronto and two in the Soho district of Manhattan, New York. In his galleries Elbaz has sold the works of Fernando Botero, Yaacov Agam, Michael Eisemann, and the original silk screens of Andy Warhol's "10 Jewish Geniuses".

His own work focuses on tension between communities. His work has been featured in Canadian Jewish News, ARTnews, The Jewish Press, San Diego Jewish Times, The Toronto Chronicle, and Time.

Thirty six years after leaving, Elbaz returned to Israel. He set up a print making and framing studio, art gallery, and artists' studios at Kibbutz Sde Nehemiah. He is currently running an artists' placement to allow young artists to showcase their work whilst remaining in the north. In collaboration with local artists he will promote and sell Israeli art in North America.
