= Zytglogge =

Medieval tower in Bern, Switzerland

Zeitglockenturm
- Zytglogge (German)
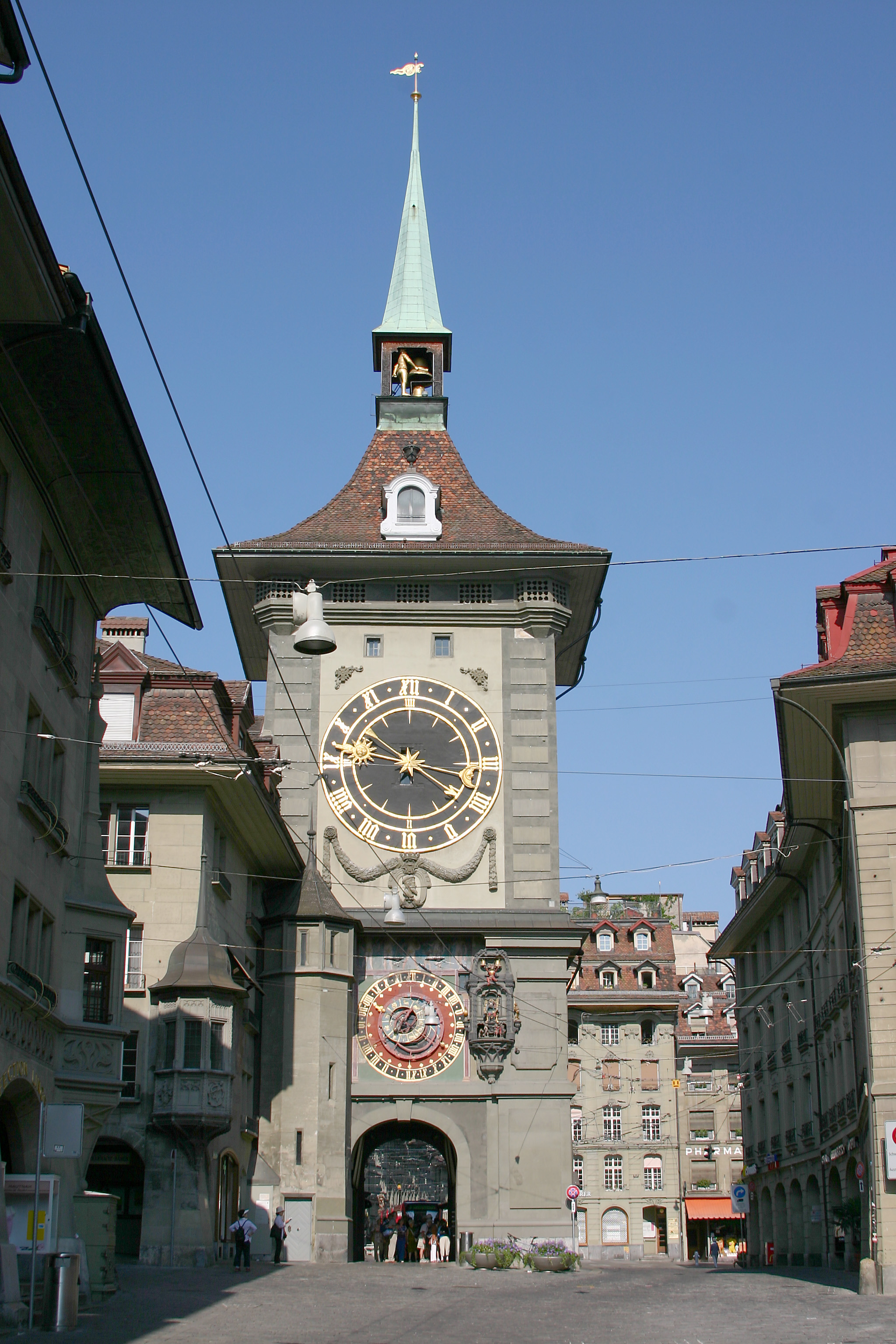
- The east front of the Zytglogge at the end of the Kramgasse.

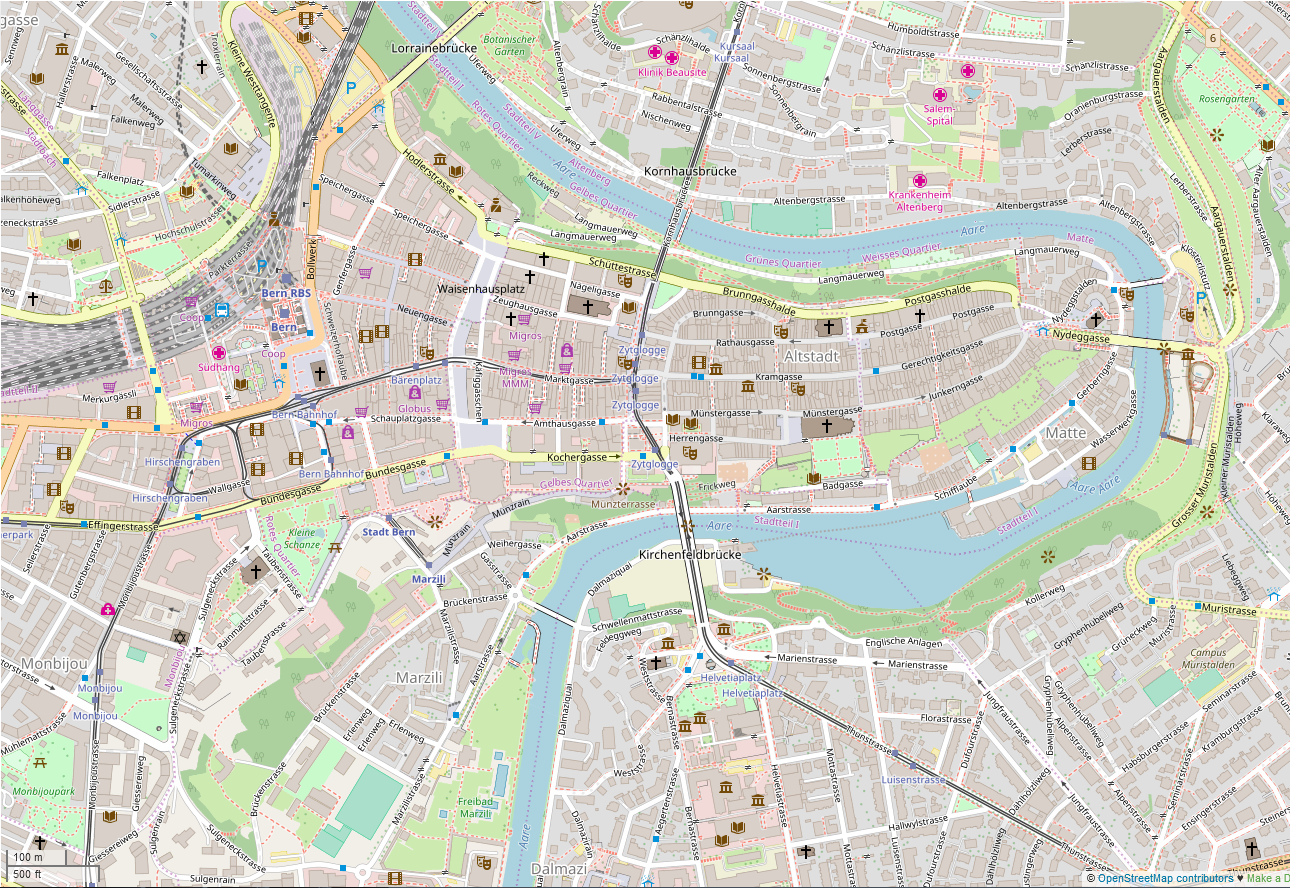
- Location within Bern Location within Canton of Bern Location within Switzerland
- 46°56′53″N 7°26′52″E
- Location: Old City of Bern

History
- Built: c. 1218–20

Site notes
- Architectural style: Medieval structure. External appearance: Baroque with Gothic elements
- Governing body: City of Bern

UNESCO World Heritage Site
- Part of: Old City of Bern world heritage site

Swiss Cultural Property of National Significance

The Zytglogge (Bernese German: [ˈtsiˌkːlɔkːə]; lit. 'time bell') is a landmark medieval tower in Bern, Switzerland. Built in the early 13th century, it has served the city as a guard tower, prison, clock tower, centre of urban life and civic memorial.

Despite the many redecorations and renovations it has undergone in its 800 years of existence, the Zytglogge is one of Bern's most recognisable symbols and the oldest monument of the city, and with its 15th-century astronomical clock, a major tourist attraction. It is a heritage site of national significance, and part of the Old City of Bern, a UNESCO World Heritage Site.

== History ==
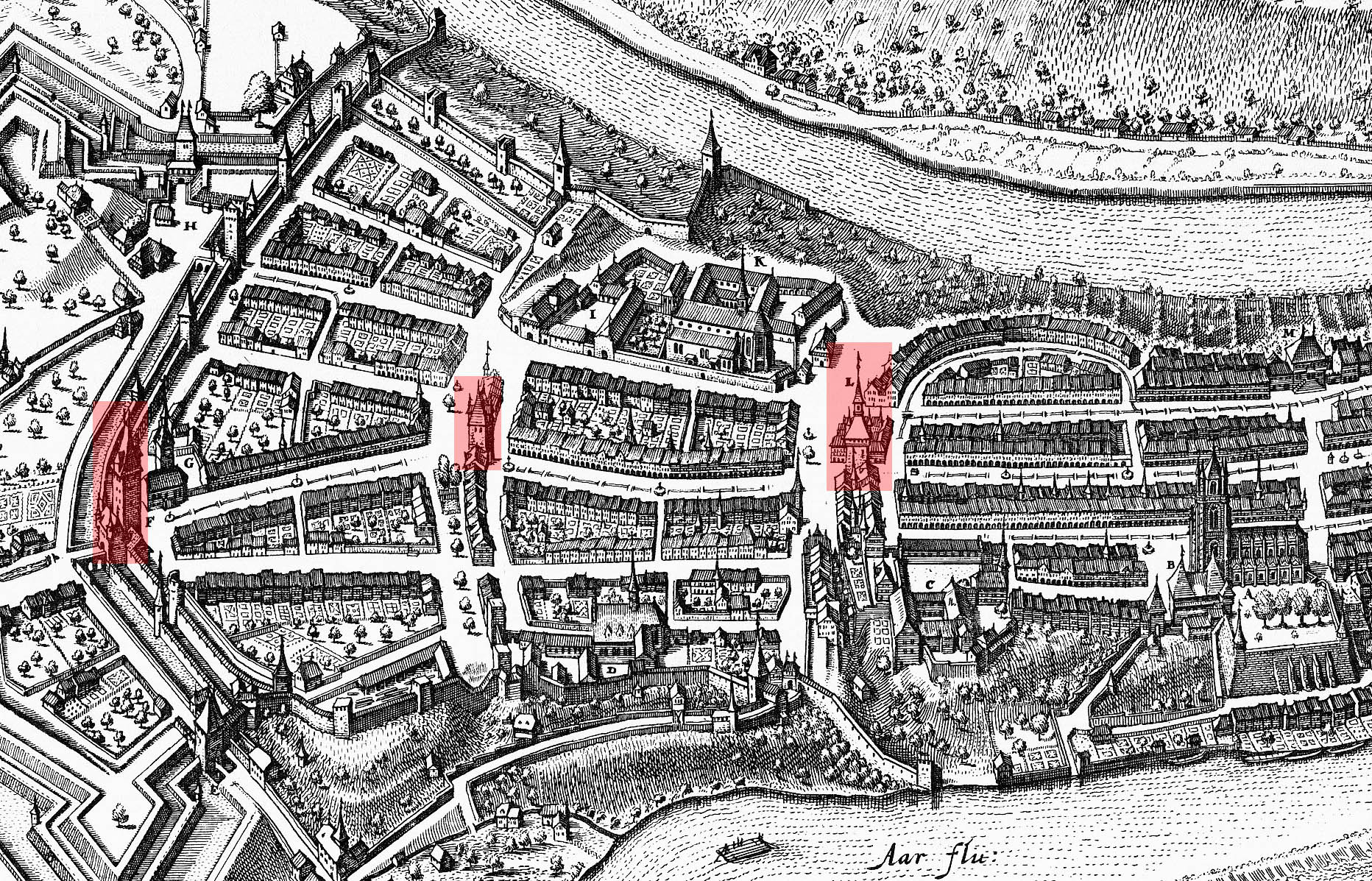
Bern in 1638 with its three medieval guard towers, from left to right: Christoffelturm, Käfigturm, Zytglogge. (See full map)

When it was built around 1218–1220, the Zytglogge served as the gate tower of Bern's western fortifications. These were erected after the city's first westward expansion following its de facto independence from the Empire. At that time, the Zytglogge was a squat building of only 16 metres (52 ft) in height. When the rapid growth of the city and the further expansion of the fortifications (up to the Käfigturm) relegated the tower to second-line status at around 1270–1275, it was heightened by 7 metres (23 ft) to overlook the surrounding houses.

Only after the city's western defences were extended again in 1344–1346 up to the now-destroyed Christoffelturm, the Zytglogge was converted to a women's prison, notably housing Pfaffendirnen – "priests' whores", women convicted of sexual relations with clerics. At this time, the Zytglogge also received its first slanted roof.

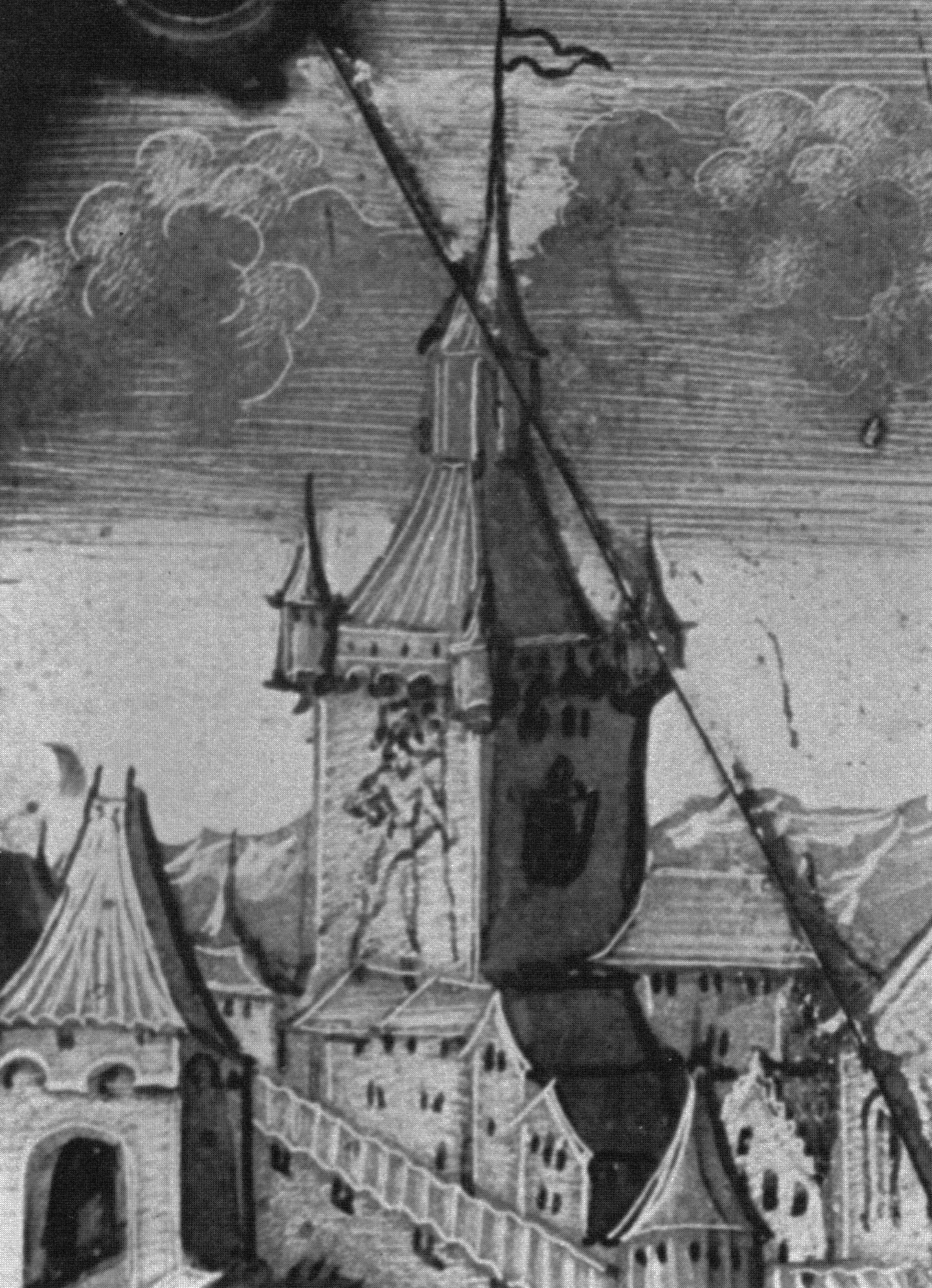
The Zytglogge as shown on a 1542 glass painting.

In the great fire of 1405, the tower burnt out completely. It suffered severe structural damage that required thorough repairs, which were not complete until after the last restoration in 1983. The prison cells were abandoned and a clock was first installed above the gate in the early 15th century, probably including a simple astronomical clock and musical mechanism. This clock, together with the great bell cast in 1405, gave the Zytglogge its name, which in Bernese German means "time bell".

In the late 15th century, the Zytglogge and the other Bernese gate towers were extended and decorated after the Burgundian Romantic fashion. The Zytglogge received a new lantern (including the metal bellman visible today), four decorative corner towerlets, heraldic decorations and probably its stair tower. The astronomical clock was extended to its current state. In 1527–30, the clockwork was completely rebuilt by Kaspar Brunner, and the gateway was overarched to provide a secure foundation for the heavy machinery.

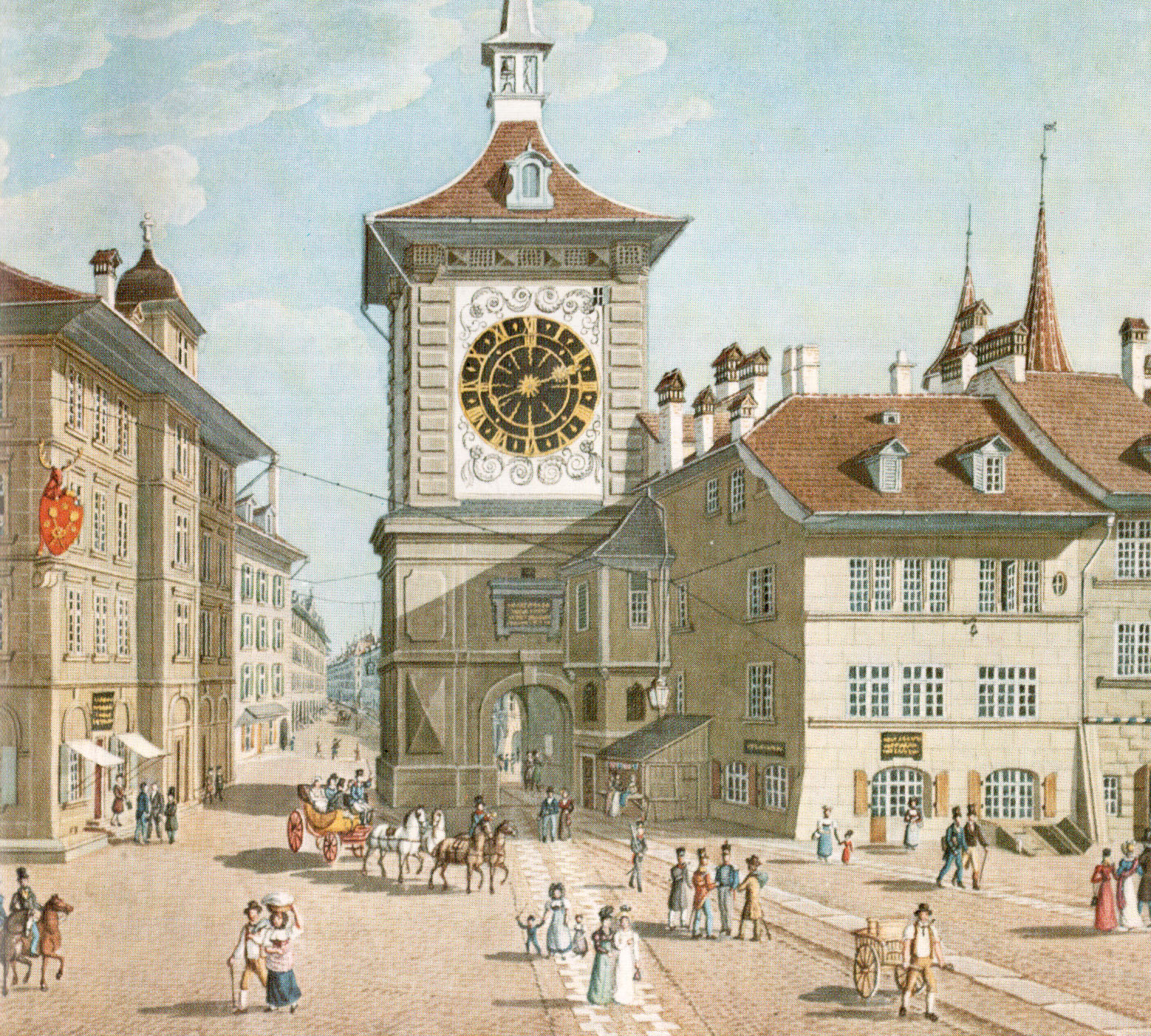
The Zytglogge's west façade in 1830, after the 1770 restructuring.

The Zytglogge's exterior was repainted by Gotthard Ringgli and Kaspar Haldenstein in 1607–1610, who introduced the large clock faces that now dominate the east and west façades of the tower. The corner towerlets were removed again some time before 1603. In 1770–1771, the Zytglogge was renovated by Niklaus Hebler and Ludwig Emanuel Zehnder, who refurbished the structure in order to suit the tastes of the late Baroque, giving the tower its contemporary outline.

Both façades were again repainted in the Rococo style by Rudolf von Steiger in 1890. The idealising historicism of the design came to be disliked in the 20th century, and a 1929 competition produced the façade designs visible today: on the west façade, Victor Surbek's fresco "Beginning of Time" and on the east façade, a reconstruction of the 1770 design by Kurt Indermühle. In 1981–1983, the Zytglogge was thoroughly renovated again and generally restored to its 1770 appearance. In the advent season and from Easter until the end of October, it is illuminated after dusk.

=== Name ===
The Bernese German Zytglogge translates to Zeitglocke in Standard German and to time bell in English; 'Glocke' is German for 'bell', as in the related term 'glockenspiel'. A "time bell" was one of the earliest public timekeeping devices, consisting of a clockwork connected to a hammer that rang a small bell at the full hour. Such a device was installed in the Wendelstein in Bern – the tower of the Leutkirche church which the Münster later replaced – in 1383 at the latest; it alerted the bell-ringer to ring the tower bells.

The name of Zytglogge was first recorded in 1413. Previously, the tower was referred to as the kebie ("cage", i.e., prison) and after its post-1405 reconstruction, the nüwer turm ("new tower").

== Exterior ==
=== External structure ===
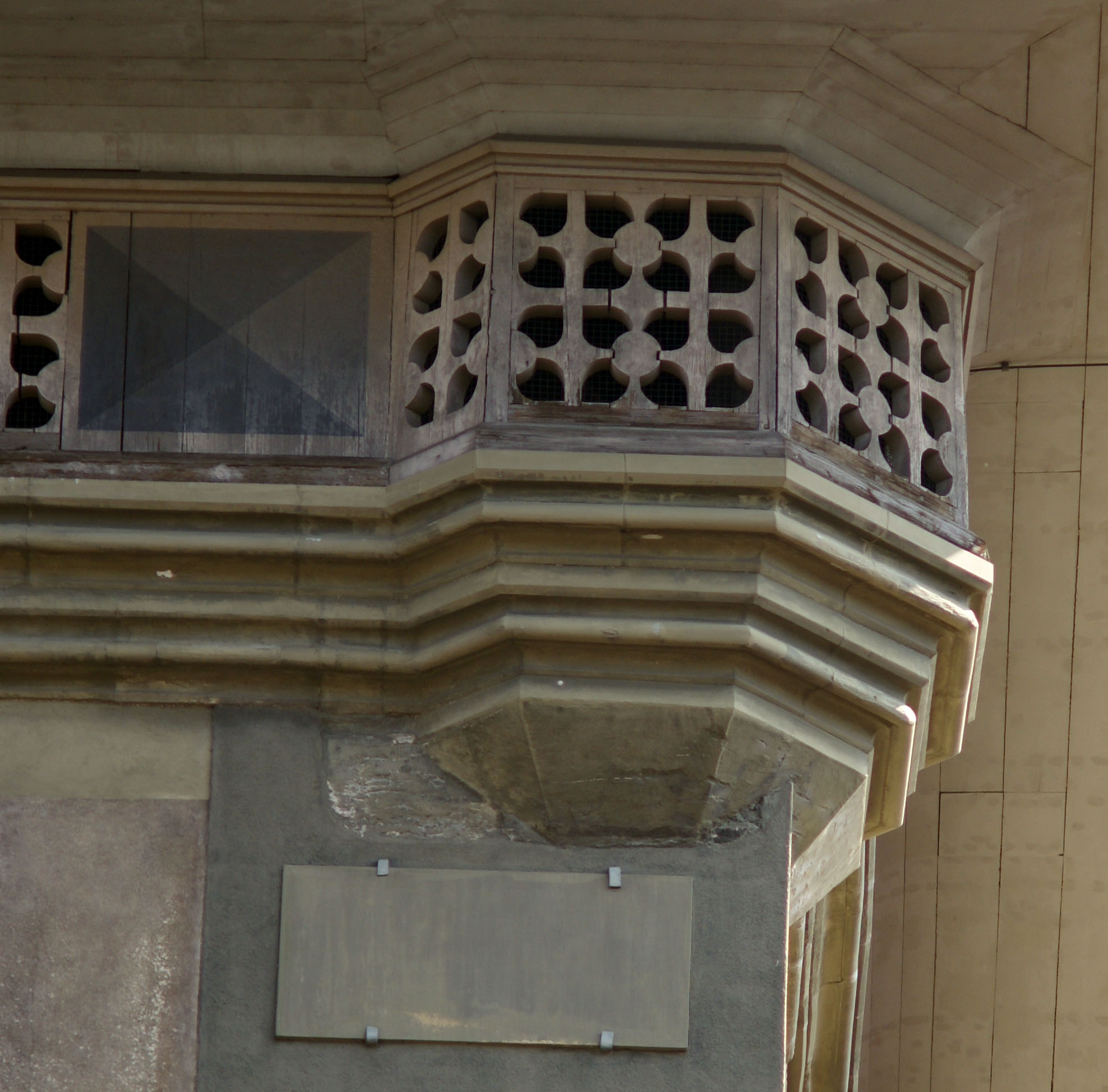
Detail: wooden Gothic whisker cornice, corner towerlet base and decorative plating.

The Zytglogge has an overall height of 54.5 metres (179 ft), and a height of 24 metres (79 ft) up to the roof-edge. Its rectangular floor plan measures 11.2 by 10.75 metres (36.7 by 35.3 ft). The wall strengths vary widely, ranging from 260 centimetres (100 in) in the west, where the tower formed part of the city walls, to 65 centimetres (26 in) in the east.

The outward appearance of the Zytglogge is determined by the 1770 renovation. Only the late Gothic cornice below the roof and the stair tower are visible artifacts of the tower's earlier history.

The main body of the tower is divided into the two-storey plinth, whose exterior is made of alpine limestone, and the three-storey tower shaft sheathed in sandstone. The shaft's seemingly massive corner blocks are decorative fixtures held in place by visible iron hooks. Below the roof, the cornice spans around the still-visible bases of the former corner towerlets. The two-story attic is covered by the sweeping, red-tiled, late Gothic spire, in which two spire lights are set to the West and East. They are crowned by ornamental urns with pinecone knobs reconstructed in 1983 from 18th-century drawings.

From atop the spire, the wooden pinnacle, copper-sheathed since 1930, rises an additional 15 metres (49 ft) into the skies, crowned with a gilded knob and a weather vane displaying a cut-out coat of arms of Bern.

=== Bells and bell-striker ===
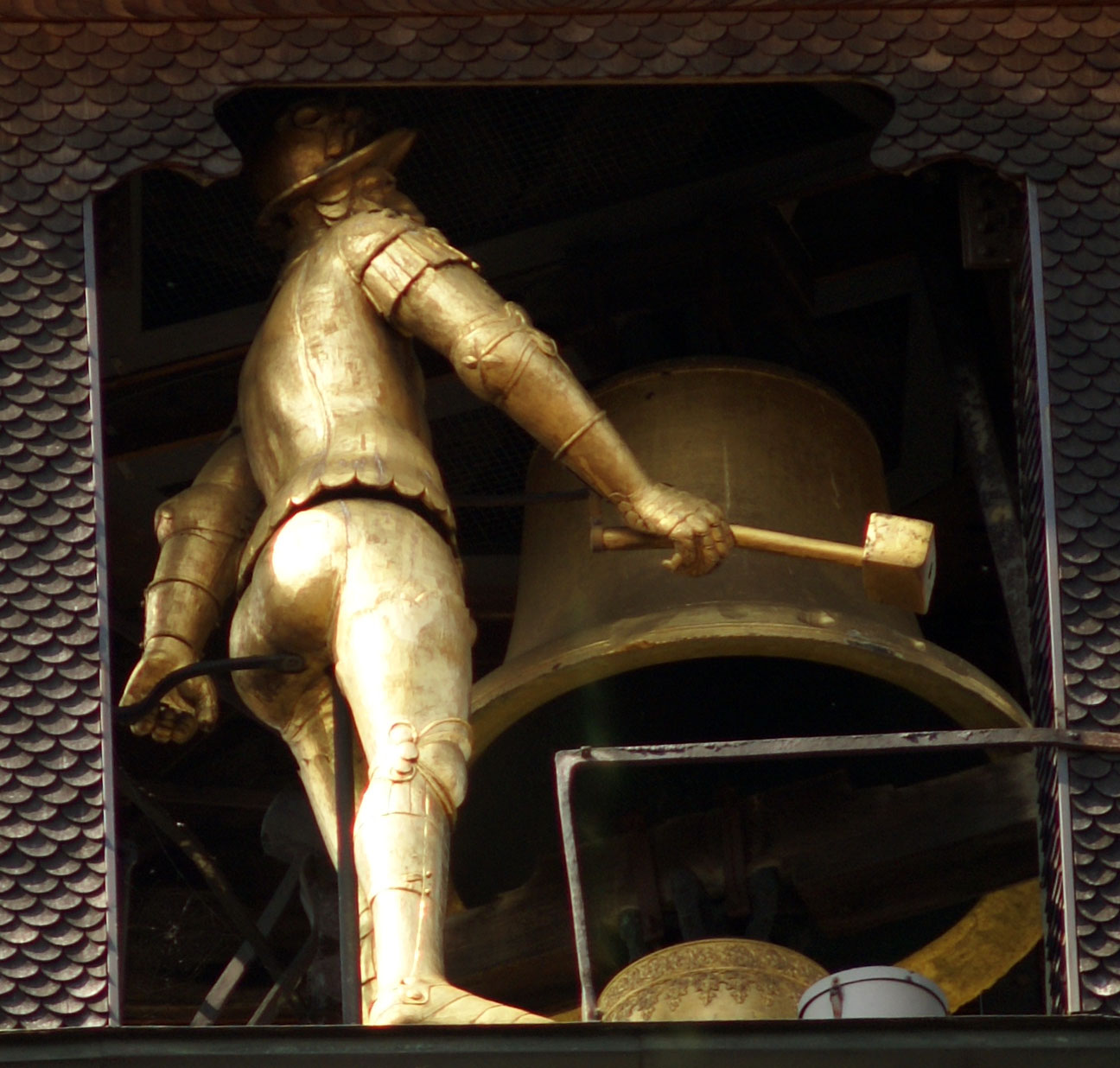
Detail: Gilded Jacquemart and hour bell. Below, the top of the smaller quarter-hour bell.

The tower's two namesake bronze bells hang in the cupola at its very top.

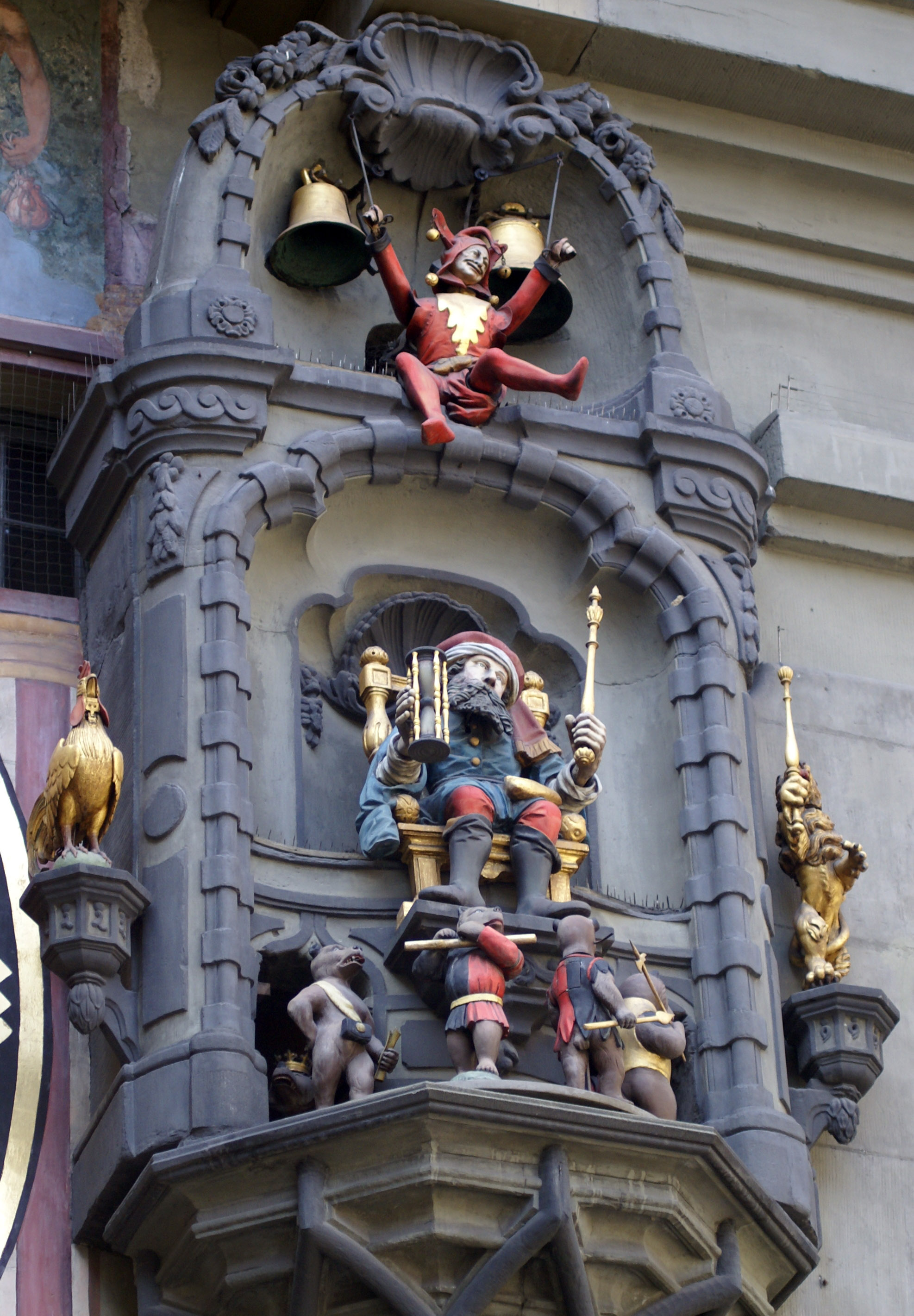
Zytglogge bellworks

The great hour bell, cast by Johann Reber, has remained unchanged since the tower's reconstruction in 1405. It has a diameter of 127 centimetres (50 in), a weight of 1,400 kilograms (3,100 lb) and rings with a nominal tone of e'. The inscription on the bell reads, in Latin:

"In the October month of the year 1405 I was cast by Master John called Reber of Aarau. I am vessel and wax, and to all I tell the hours of the day."

When the great bell rings out every full hour, struck by a large clockwork-operated hammer, passers-by see a gilded figure in full harness moving its arm to strike it. The larger-than-life figure of bearded Chronos, the Greek personification of time, is traditionally nicknamed Hans von Thann by the Bernese. The wooden bell-striker, which has been replaced several times, has been a fixture of the Zytglogge since the renewal of the astronomical clock in 1530, whose clockwork also controls the figure's motions. The original wooden Chronos might have been created by master craftsman Albrecht von Nürnberg, while the current and most recent Hans is a 1930 reconstruction of a Baroque original. The bell-striker has been gilded, just like the bells, since 1770.

Below the hour bell hangs the smaller quarter-hour bell, also rung by a clockwork hammer. It was cast in 1887 to replace the cracked 1486 original.

=== Clock faces and façade decorations ===
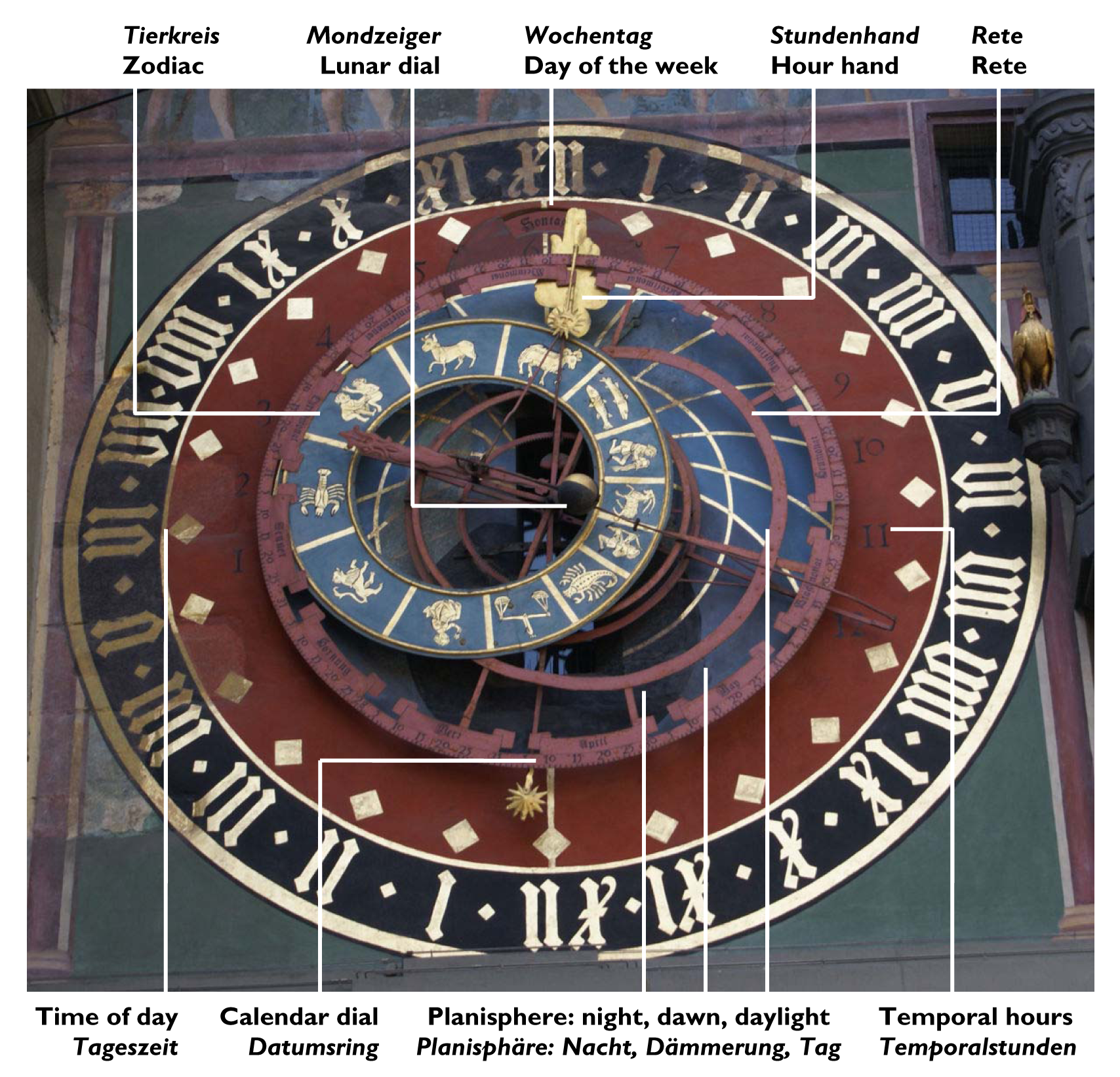
Photograph of astronomical dial with labeled parts.

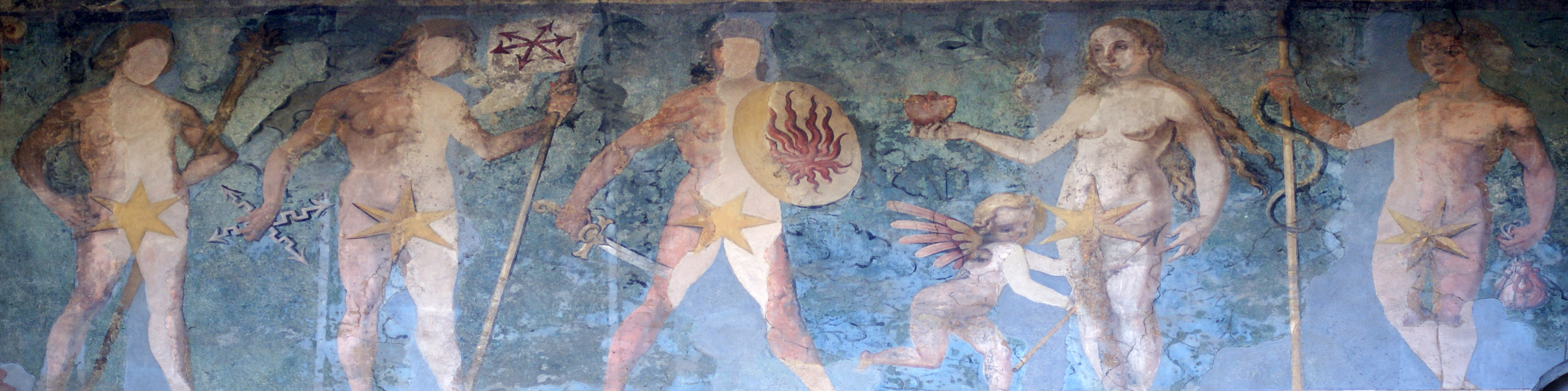
The frieze with Saturn, Jupiter, Mars, Venus, and Mercury.

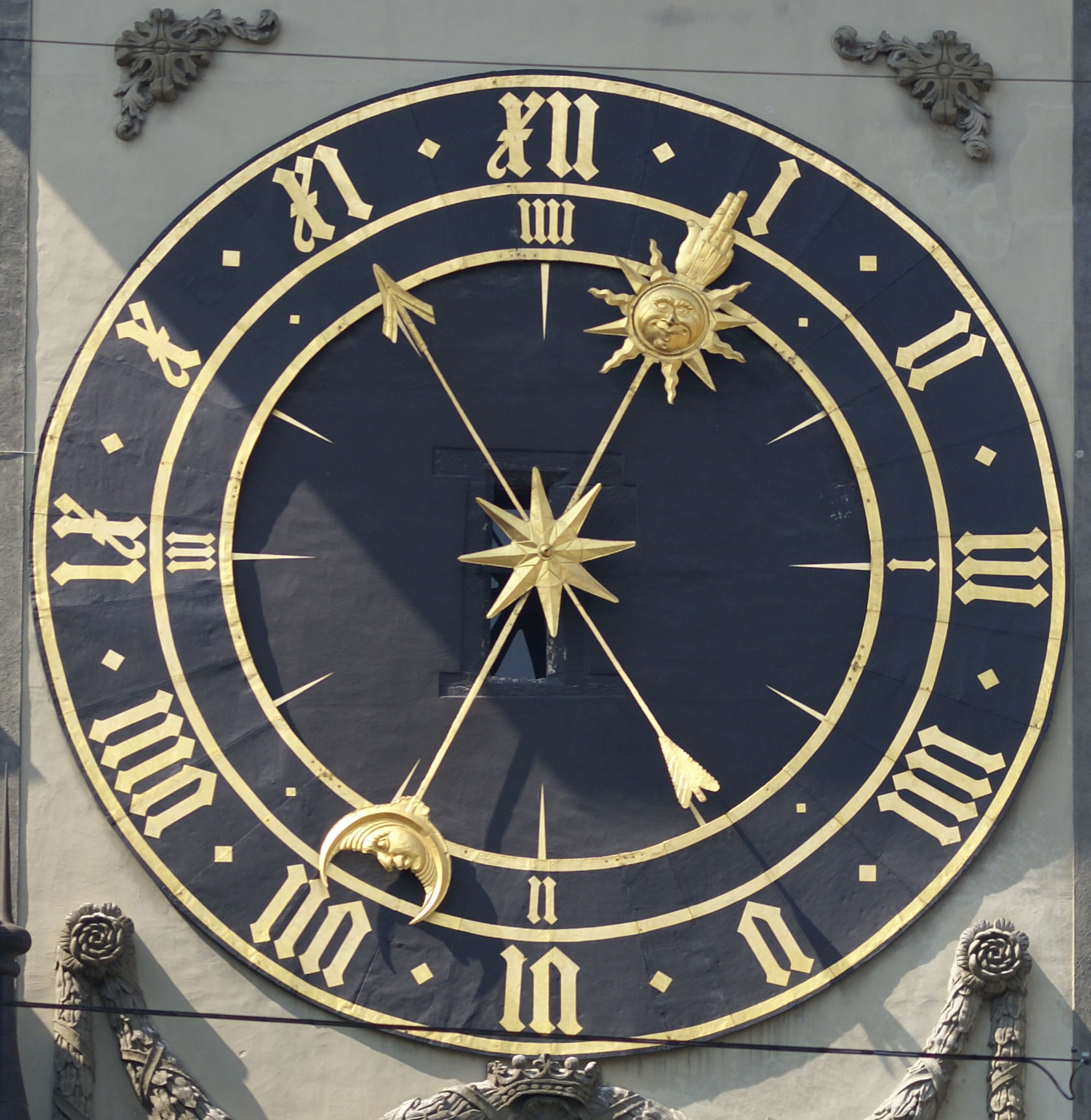
The eastern clockface.

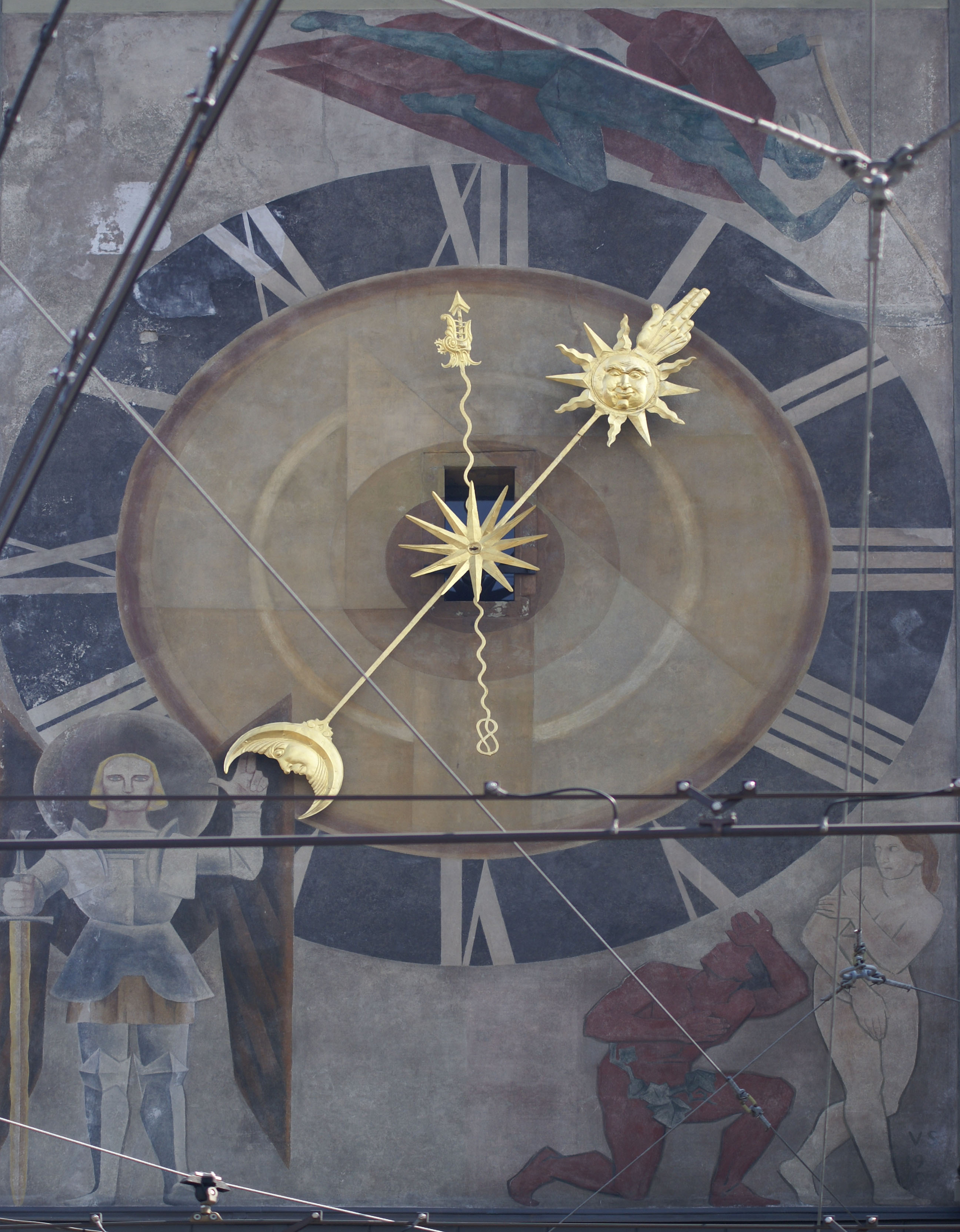
The western clockface (including some tram cabling).

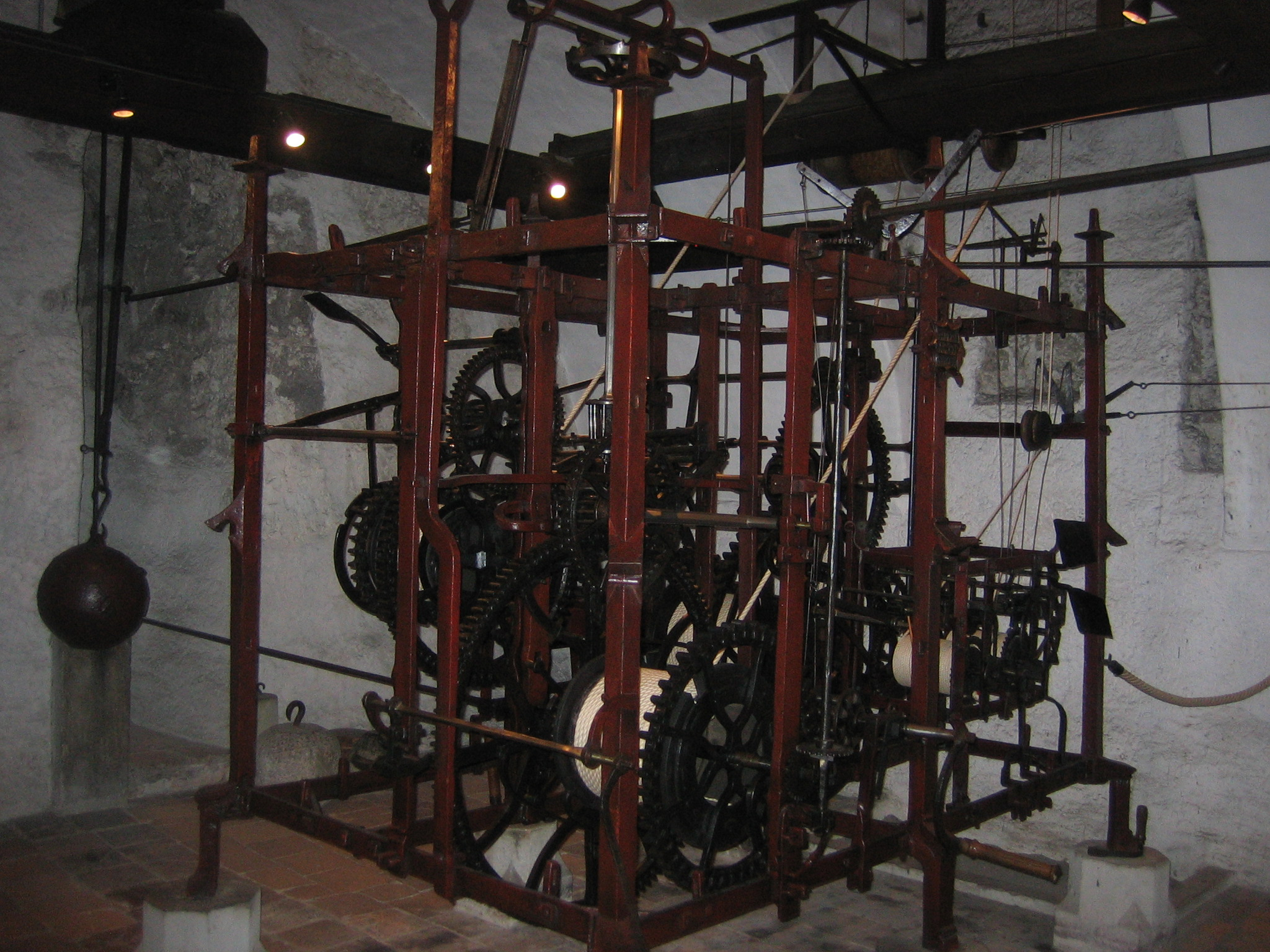
The movement forged in situ in 1530 by Kaspar Brunner, "cannon ball" pendulum bob on the left.

Both principal façades, East and West, are dominated by large clockfaces. The Zytglogge's first clockface was likely located on the plinth, but was moved up to the center of the shaft during the tower's 15th-century reconfiguration.

The eastern clock face features an outer ring of large golden Roman numerals, on which the larger hand indicates the hour, and an inner ring on which the smaller hand indicates the minutes. The golden Sun on the hour hand is pivot-mounted so that it always faces up.

The western clock face has similar hands, but is an integral part of Victor Surbek's 1929 fresco "Beginning of Time". The painting depicts Chronos swooping down with cape fluttering, and, below the clockface, Adam and Eve's eviction from Paradise by an angel.

=== Astronomical clock ===
The dial of the Zytglogge's astronomical clock is built in the form of an astrolabe. It is backed by a stereographically projected planisphere divided into three zones: the black night sky, the deep blue zone of dawn and the light blue day sky. The skies are crisscrossed with the golden lines of the horizon, dawn, the tropics and the temporal hours, which divide the time of daylight into twelve hours whose length varies with the time of year.

Around the planisphere moves the rete, a web-like metal cutout representing the zodiac, which also features a Julian calendar dial. Above the rete, a display indicates the day of the week. Because leap days are not supported by the clockwork, the calendar hand has to be reset manually each leap year on 29 February. A moon dial circles the inner ring of the zodiac, displaying the moon phase. The principal hand of the clock indicates the time of day on the outer ring of 24 golden Roman numerals, which run twice from I to XII. It features two suns, the smaller one indicating the date on the rete's calendar dial. The larger one circles the zodiac at one revolution per year and also rotates across the planisphere once per day. Its crossing of the horizon and dawn lines twice per day allows the timing of sunrise, dawn, dusk and sunset.

The painted frieze above the astronomical clock shows five deities from classical antiquity, each representing both a day of the week and a planet in their order according to Ptolemaic cosmology. From left to right, they are: Saturn with sickle and club for Saturday, Jupiter with thunderbolts for Thursday, Mars with sword and shield for Tuesday, Venus with Cupid for Friday and Mercury with staff and bag for Wednesday.

==== Movement ====
The clock dial has been dated to either the building phases of 1405 or 1467-83, or to the installation of the Brunner clockwork in 1527-30. Ueli Bellwald notes that the planisphere uses a southern projection, as was characteristic for 15th-century astronomical clocks; all later such clocks use a northern projection. This would seem to confirm the dating of the clock to the 1405 or 1467/83 renovations.

A clock is documented in this tower since 1405, when a new bell was installed.

== Interior ==
The Zytglogge's internal layout has changed over time to reflect the tower's change of purpose from guard tower to city prison to clock tower. The thirteenth-century guard tower was not much more than a hollow shell of walls that was open towards the city in the east. Only in the fourteenth century was a layer of four storeys inserted.

The rooms above the clockwork mechanism were used by the city administration for various purposes up until the late 20th century, including as archives, storerooms, as a firehose magazine and even as an air raid shelter. The interior was frequently remodelled in a careless, even vandalistic fashion; for instance, all but three of the original wooden beams supporting the intermediate floors were destroyed. Since 1979, the tower's interior is empty again and only accessible in the course of guided tours.

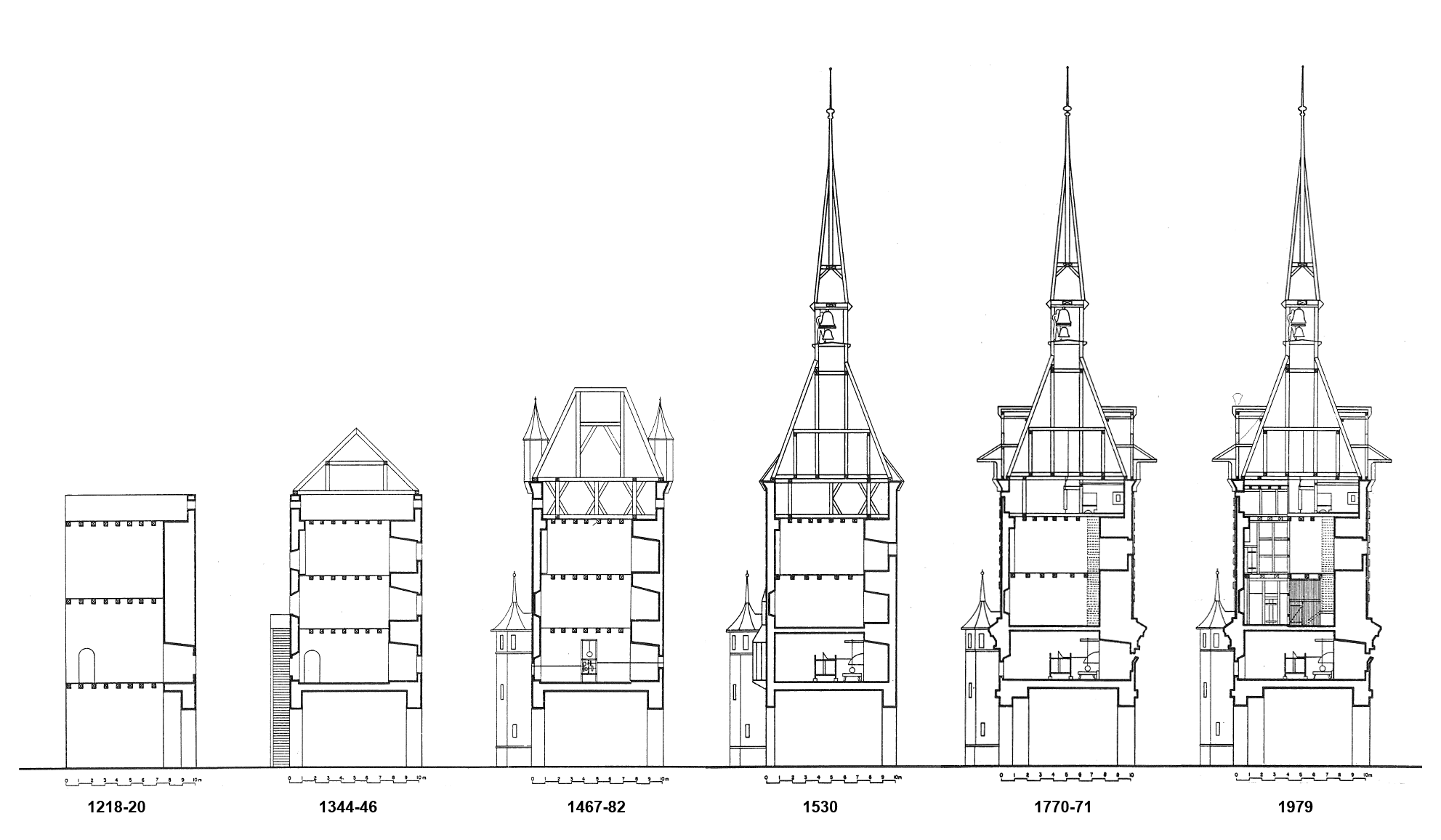
East/West cross section of the Zytglogge after each of its principal building phases and in 1979.

== Bibliography ==
- Bellwald, Ueli (1983). Der Zytglogge in Bern (in German). Gesellschaft für Schweizerische Kunstgeschichte. ISBN 978-3-85782-341-1.
- Hofer, Paul (1952). Die Kunstdenkmäler des Kantons Bern, Band 1: Die Stadt Bern (in German). Gesellschaft für Schweizerische Kunstgeschichte. ISBN 978-3-906131-13-9. Archived from the original on 18 January 2015.
- Marti, Markus (2005). 600 Jahre Zytglogge Bern. Eine kleine Chronik der Zeitmessung (in German). Bern: Stämpfli. ISBN 978-3-7272-1180-5.
- Messerli, Jakob (1999). "Der Zytgloggenturm – öffentliche Räderuhren in Bern im 15. Jahrhundert". In Beer, Ellen J.; Gramaccini, Norberto; Gutscher-Schmid, Charlotte; Schwinges, Rainer C. (eds.). Berns grosse Zeit. Berner Zeiten (2nd ed.). Bern: Schulverlag bmv and Stämpfli Verlag. pp. 579–588. ISBN 978-3-906721-28-6.
- Bellwald, Ulrich; Suter+Partner Architekten (1979). 400 – Sanierungsprojekt Zytglogge Bern: Analysen, Konzepte, Kosten (Report) (in German). Bern: Hochbauamt der Stadt Bern.
