= Kaspar Brunner =

Swiss clockmaker

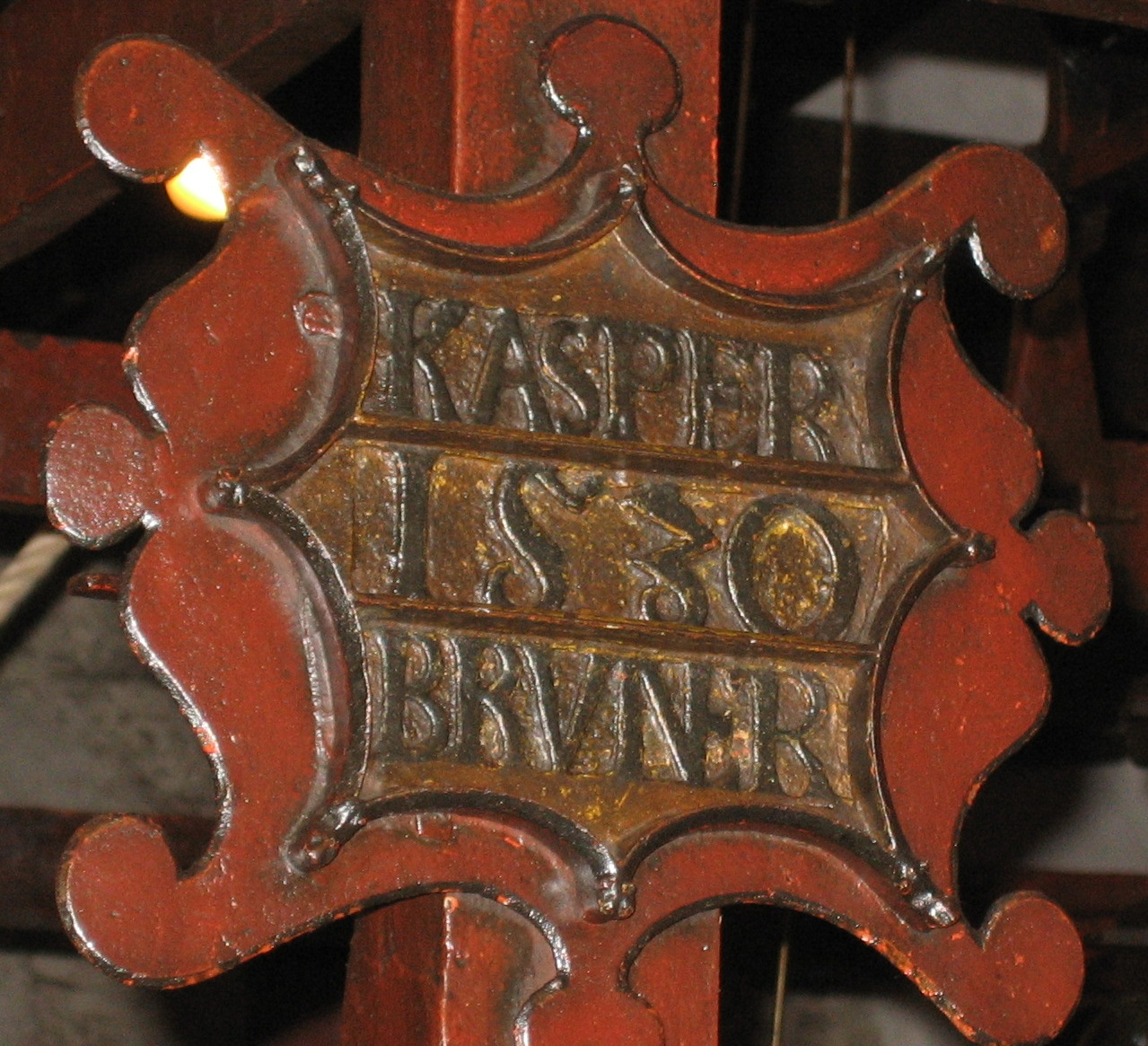
Brunner's nameplate on the Zytglogge clockwork.

Kaspar Brunner (died 1561) was a Swiss mechanic best known for his construction of the clockwork of the Zytglogge, Bern's medieval clock-tower, in 1527–1530.

Of unknown origins, Brunner is first recorded in 1526 on the occasion of being appointed zitgloggenrichter, or timekeeper of the Zytglogge. After the previous clockwork broke down beyond repair, the city council commissioned Brunner in 1527 to build a new one for the sum of 1.000 gulden. In the following three years, Brunner built the massive mechanism that continues to operate the tower's astronomical clock to this day.

After the successful installation of his clockwork, Brunner appears to have risen fast in Bernese society. He was admitted into the Gesellschaft zu Schmieden, the blacksmiths' guild, in 1530, thus fulfilling the prerequisite for holding public office. He was elected Büchsenmeister or arsenal chief in 1537 and married a patrician's daughter, Anna von Graffenried, in 1541. In the same year, he was called to Nuremberg, then the Holy Roman Empire's largest city, where he headed the urban arsenal until his death in 1561.

As far as we know, Brunner never built another clockwork. Having worked as locksmith, blacksmith, engineer, gunsmith and clockmaker at various times during his life, Brunner is a characteristic representative of the type of mostly self-taught engineers that emerged at the threshold of the early modern period in Europe and who built most late medieval clockworks. It was not until the second half of the 16th century that watchmaking came to be regarded as a distinct profession.
