= Gottlieb Ott =

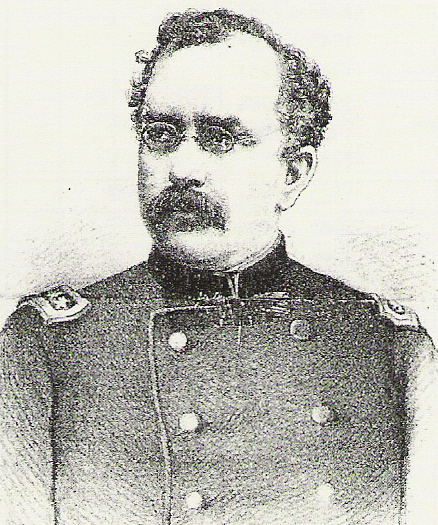
A picture of Gottlieb Ott, Swiss building contractor

Gottlieb Ott (1832, Worb – 4 December 1882) was a Swiss building contractor. Ott and his company are credited with planning and constructing many buildings and structures in and around Bern, including the church field bridge. He also supervised the removal of the Christoffelturm, a local tower built in the 14th century.

== Life and family history ==
Ott's great grandfather had migrated from Swabia in Germany to Jegenstorf in 1782, and it was his grandfather who established the Otts in Worb. Ott's schooling was based in Bern, and he later studied at the polytechnic institute of Karlsruhe. After he finished his studies, he dabbled in several enterprises before opening a private construction company. In 1864, this company evolved into Ott & Cie, which would become one of the best known and most successful manufacturing and construction outfits of its time, and visibly impacting the city. From there, Ott expanded and was taken into a tight fold of advice on Bern's infrastructure in 1866, a year after he removed the Christoffelturm. Within this group was Jakob Stämpfli, a well-known Swiss politician.

== Ott in popular culture ==
A song or ode was written about Ott, inspired by his influence on Bern:

If you just let dear Ott have his way

and hope in him at all times,
for you he will marvelously make thrive

the glory of the state finances.

== Suicide ==
In 1865, Ott entered politics by joining the Burgergemeinde Bern. In 1881 he suffered a great political defeat, having lost an election. Coupled with large financial stress, this loss caused Ott to become suicidal. He took his life on 4 December 1882.

The suicide was described by the federation:

On Saturday evening, December 2, 1882 he sat until 11 o'clock with friends at the hospital. He says good-bye there and heads home, however he did not arrive. The search began on Sunday, on Monday company workers took part in the search. On Wednesday morning, December 6, 1882 his corpse was found in the Aarekanal. The autopsy shows that he had drowned. Since only a small wound at the head was found, the possibility of crime was excluded. His watch showed the time as 02:00 o'clock.
