= Norberčany =

- Municipality
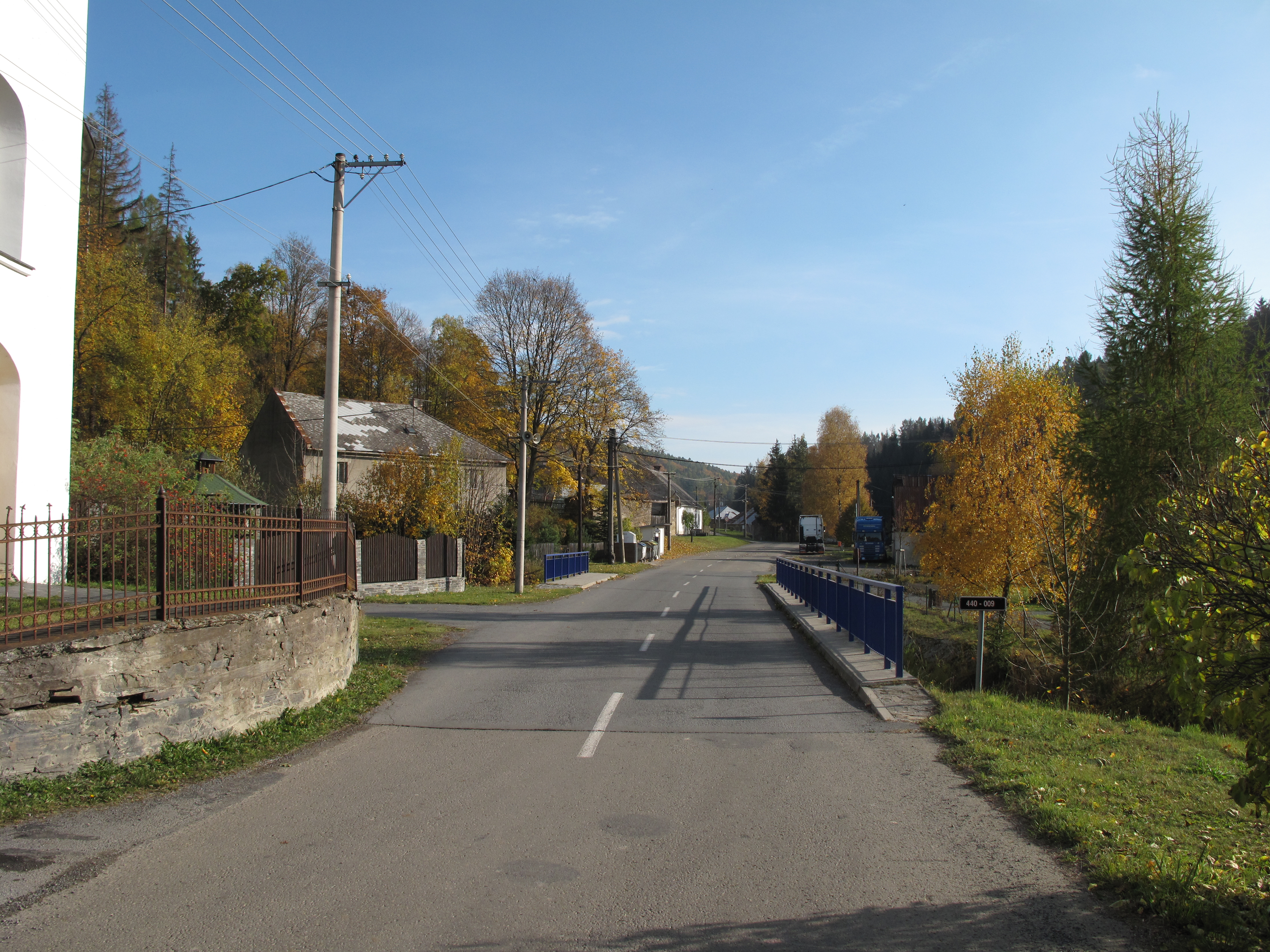
- Main road

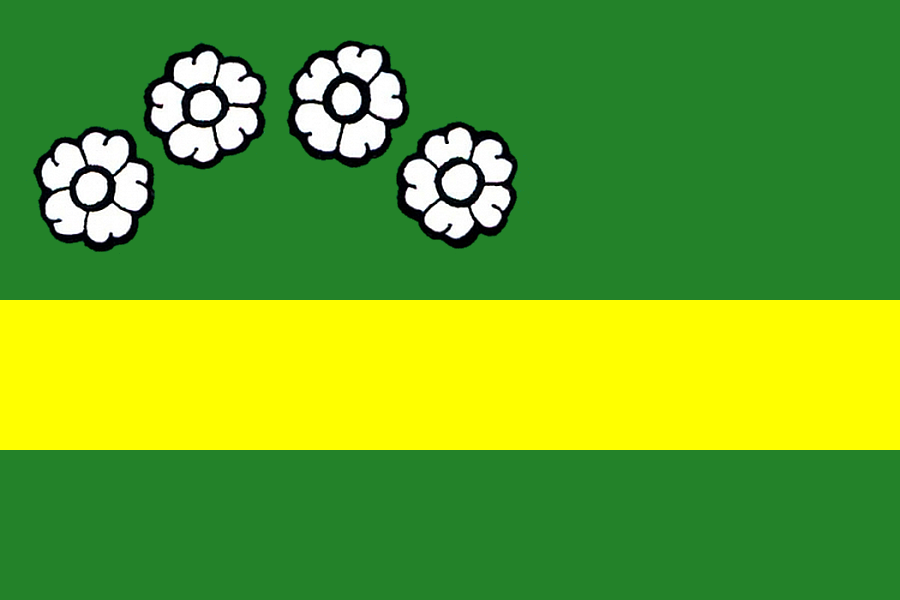
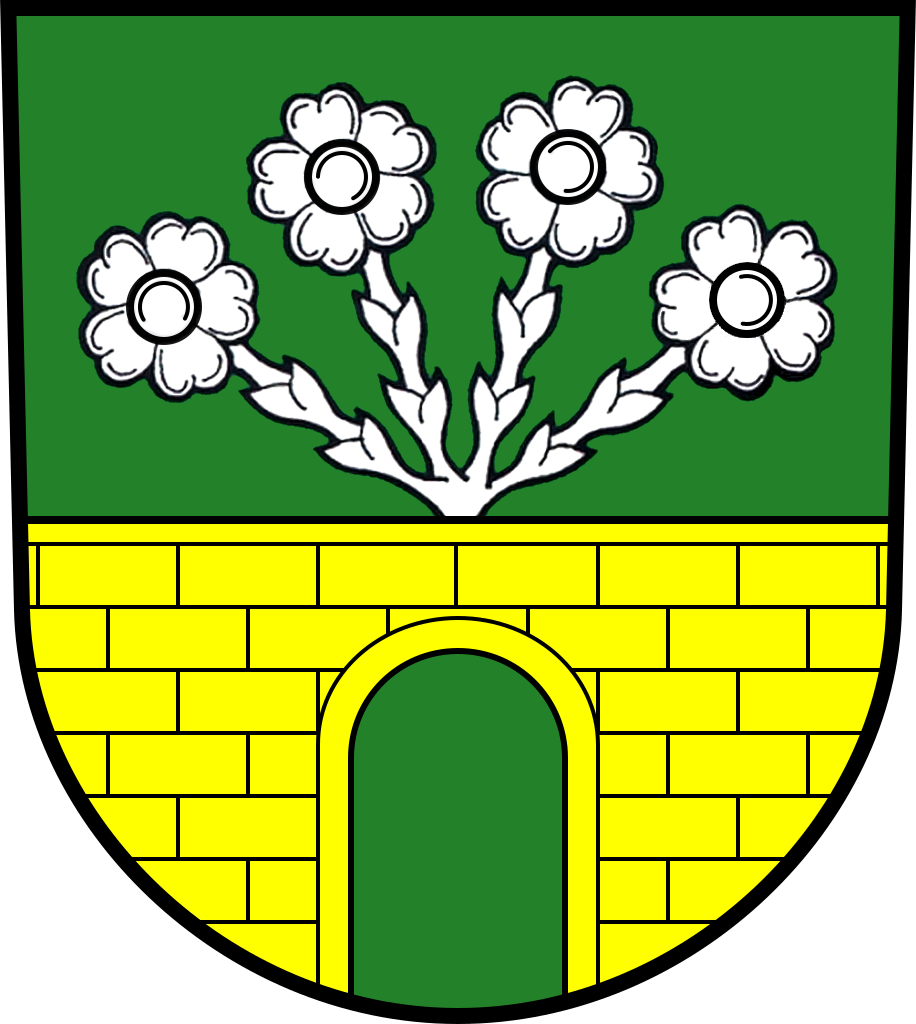
- Flag Coat of arms

- Location in the Czech Republic
- Coordinates: 49°45′14″N 17°30′23″E
- Country: Czech Republic
- Region: Olomouc
- District: Olomouc
- First mentioned: 1397

Area
  - Total: 22.36 km^{2} (8.63 sq mi)
- Elevation: 544 m (1,785 ft)

Population (2026-01-01)
  - Total: 244
  - Density: 10.9/km^{2} (28.3/sq mi)
- Time zone: UTC+1 (CET)
  - Summer (DST): UTC+2 (CEST)
- Postal code: 793 05
- Website: www.norbercany.cz

Norberčany (German: Nürnberg) is a municipality and village in Olomouc District in the Olomouc Region of the Czech Republic. It has about 200 inhabitants.

Norberčany lies approximately 27 kilometres (17 mi) north-east of Olomouc and 224 km (139 mi) east of Prague.

== Administrative division ==
Norberčany consists of four municipal parts (in brackets population according to the 2021 census):

- Norberčany (94)
- Nová Véska (8)
- Stará Libavá (120)
- Trhavice (21)

== Geography ==
Norberčany is located about 25 kilometres (16 mi) northeast of Olomouc. It lies in the Nízký Jeseník range. The highest point is at 722 m (2,369 ft) above sea level. Most of the built-up area is situated in a valley of the stream Libavský potok.

== Demographics ==
Historical population
Year	Pop.	±%
1869	901	—
1880	859	−4.7%
1890	880	+2.4%
1900	889	+1.0%
1910	875	−1.6%
1921	825	−5.7%
1930	813	−1.5%
1950	459	−43.5%
1961	456	−0.7%
1970	438	−3.9%
1980	430	−1.8%
1991	385	−10.5%
2001	363	−5.7%
2011	310	−14.6%
2021	243	−21.6%
Source: Censuses

== Transport ==
There are no railways or major roads passing through the municipality.
