= Phoebe Maltz Bovy =

Cultural critic

Phoebe Maltz Bovy (born 1982 or 1983) is an American Canadian cultural critic. She has a PhD in French and French Studies from New York University. She is cohost with Kat Rosenfield of the podcast Feminine Chaos.

She had a grandmother from Montréal, and moved to Canada in 2015, becoming a Canadian citizen in 2023.

In 2017, she authored the book The Perils of "Privilege".
