= Nirenberg =

Nirenberg is a surname. Notable people with the surname include:

- Darryl Nirenberg, U.S. ambassador to Romania
- David Nirenberg (born 1964), American medievalist and intellectual historian
- Louis Nirenberg (1925–2020), Canadian-born Canadian-American mathematician
- Marshall Warren Nirenberg (1927–2010), American biochemist and geneticist
- Ron Nirenberg (born 1977), Mayor of San Antonio, Texas, US
