= Christoffelturm =

Former tower (1346–1865) in Bern, Switzerland

Coordinates: 46.948°N 7.44°E

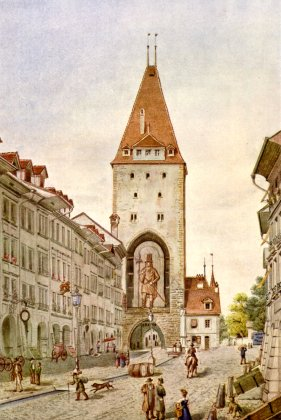
A picture depicting the tower, and its statue of Saint Christopher, about 5 years before removal

The Christoffelturm was a tower built between the years 1344 and 1346, which featured a prominently displayed statue of Saint Christopher. It was located in the old part of the Swiss city of Bern, in the upper section of Spitalgasse, near Holy Spirit Church.

After a political decision on December 15, 1864, the Christoffelturm was removed by Gottlieb Ott, a Swiss building contractor. Ott began the destruction of the tower in spring of the following year.

The decision to remove the tower, which had become a landmark of sorts, was not met without opposition, and the motion of removal succeeded only by a 415 to 411 vote.

During an extended period of time, other statues existed near or actually on the site where the tower used to stand. These included a statue of King David, both as a boy holding a slingshot, and as a man. An early 20th century plan to erect a figure of the Bernese knight Rudolf von Erlach was never realised.

== Other towers in Bern ==
Bern's other medieval guard towers are the Zytglogge and the Käfigturm. These towers still stand today.

=== Zytglogge ===
In the Zytglogge (Clock Tower), a figure of the Greek god Kronos or Chronos strikes the bell atop the tower each hour.

The tower was originally of wood, when it was built sometime between 1218 and 1220. It survived until sometime in the very early 15th century, when it was burned down in the fire that struck the city in 1405.

However, it was rebuilt with a new stone design, and has stood ever since. It was when it was rebuilt that it was fitted with a clock. The clock too, however, soon broke, and was left unserviced and broken for 122 years before 1530, when Caspar Brunner installed a new well-functioning mechanism.

=== Käfigturm ===
The Käfigturm (Cage Tower), built 1256, ceased to be a prison in 1897.
