= Albrecht von Nürnberg =

Bernese sculptor (fl. 1492–1531)

- Died: after 1531; Bern
- Other names: Bartholomäusmeister, Meister Albrecht
- Known for: Sculpture
- Movement: Late-Gothic

Albrecht von Nürnberg was a late-Gothic sculptor, probably from Nuremberg, who was active in Bern from 1492 to 1531. His first major public commission was the monumental wooden Saint Christopher figure made for Bern's Obertor in 1496–1498. After the Reformation, the figure was transformed into a Swiss mercenary. He also produced religious and civic commissions for Bern and other patrons and was associated with work at Bern Minster, including its baptismal font and several attributed sculptures. He is regarded as one of the leading sculptors of late-Gothic Bern.

== Biography ==
Albrecht von Nürnberg is first recorded in Bern in 1492. Between 1492 and 1531, he worked there as a sculptor almost continuously. In 1494, Bern's council recorded a request for him to undertake a commission in Burgdorf. He was probably from Nuremberg and was recorded as a non-citizen resident of Bern in 1498.

In 1497–1498, Albrecht was recorded as a member able to bear arms of the carpenters' guild. Very little is known about his private life, although records indicate he had children. In 1498, Albrecht left Bern with a recommendation from the city authorities, which commended his work and encouraged others to employ him. He was back in the city by 1500.

Albrecht appears to have had a steady supply of commissions, but his finances remained strained. The Bern council repeatedly pursued overdue payments from his patrons on his behalf. In 1514, when payment for an altar made for the provost of St-Imier remained outstanding, Albrecht appealed to the Bern council, which contacted the council of Biel on his behalf. He also relied on borrowed money and eventually used his house as security for his debts. Records from 1507, 1513 and 1517 show that he continued to borrow money during this period.

Albrecht's surviving work in wood and stone has been taken to suggest training in Franconia. Later scholarship has linked his training more specifically to Tilman Riemenschneider's workshop in Würzburg. He died in Bern sometime after 1531.

== Work ==
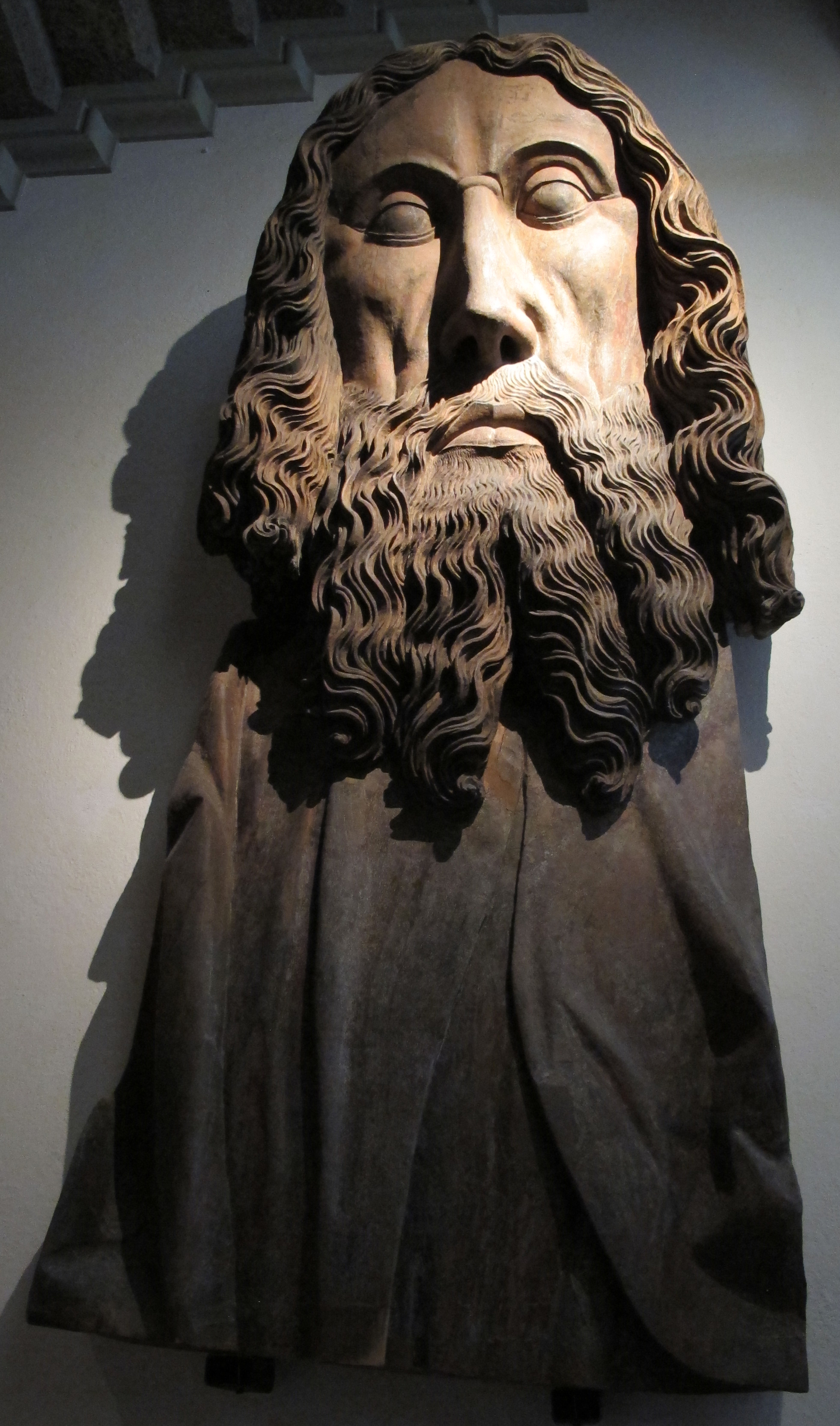
Fragment of the St. Christopher figure, Bern Historical Museum

Of the works documented under Albrecht's name, only two survive: fragments of the Berner Christoffel and the baptismal font in Bern Minster.

=== Saint Christopher and the Christoffelturm ===
Albrecht's first major public commission was a monumental wooden figure of Saint Christopher, made between 1496 and 1498 for Bern's Obertor. The gate was later known as the Christoffelturm. About 10 metres high, the sculpture stood in a niche facing into the city, where it could be seen by people leaving Bern through the main gate before setting out on their journey. The linden-wood relief showed Saint Christopher carrying the Christ Child and was associated with protection for travellers and against sudden death.

In 1528, following the Reformation in Bern, the figure was repurposed. The Christ Child was removed from the figure's shoulder, while a feathered cap, sword, and halberd were added. The transformed figure thereafter depicted a Swiss mercenary guarding the city gate. In 1583, after a fountain figure of David was erected nearby, the former Saint Christopher also came to represent Goliath, while retaining the name Christoffel.

The figure was removed from the tower in January 1865, and demolition of the Christoffelturm was completed that May. The figure was designated for use as firewood, while the head, left hand and feet were preserved and are now held by the Bern Historical Museum.

=== Other commissions ===
Albrecht received commissions from the Bern city council and also worked repeatedly for the bishop of Sion. His documented religious work included altar shrines for Schloss Obersibenthal in 1500, bishop Matthäus Schiner in 1506 and the provost of St-Imier in 1514. By 1505, the altarpiece for Schiner had been completed and assessed by experts. The following July, Bern's council asked him to collect it. He also undertook smaller commissions, including heraldic models for a stove in Bern's council chamber in 1506, and models for the large bell of Bern Minster in the same year.

=== Bern Minster and attributed works ===
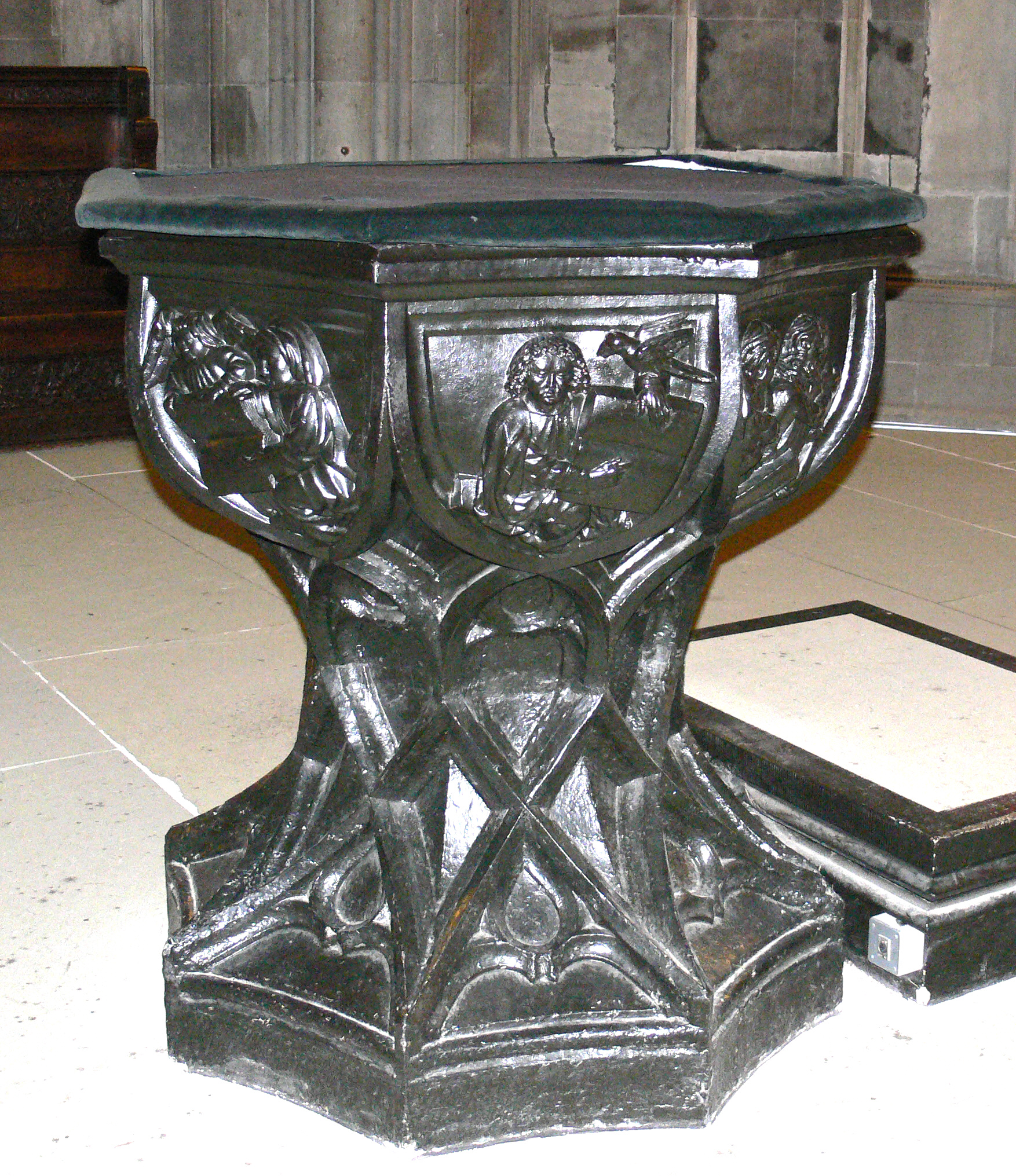
The baptismal font of Bern Minster, attributed to Albrecht

The baptismal font in Bern Minster dates from 1524–1525. The stone block for the font was brought from Vevey, and records show Albrecht was authorised to work on it in November 1524. Subsequent stylistic study strengthened the attribution of the Berner Christoffel to Albrecht, but assigned the baptismal font to his workshop, with Albrecht possibly responsible for the design. The font's eight reliefs depict God the Father, the Baptism of Christ, Mary with the Christ Child, Saint Vincent and the four Evangelists. Its original location is uncertain, although it was probably near the Bubenberg Chapel. During the Reformation it was moved into the altar area. The font was restored in 2018–2019, revealing an earlier black finish imitating marble.

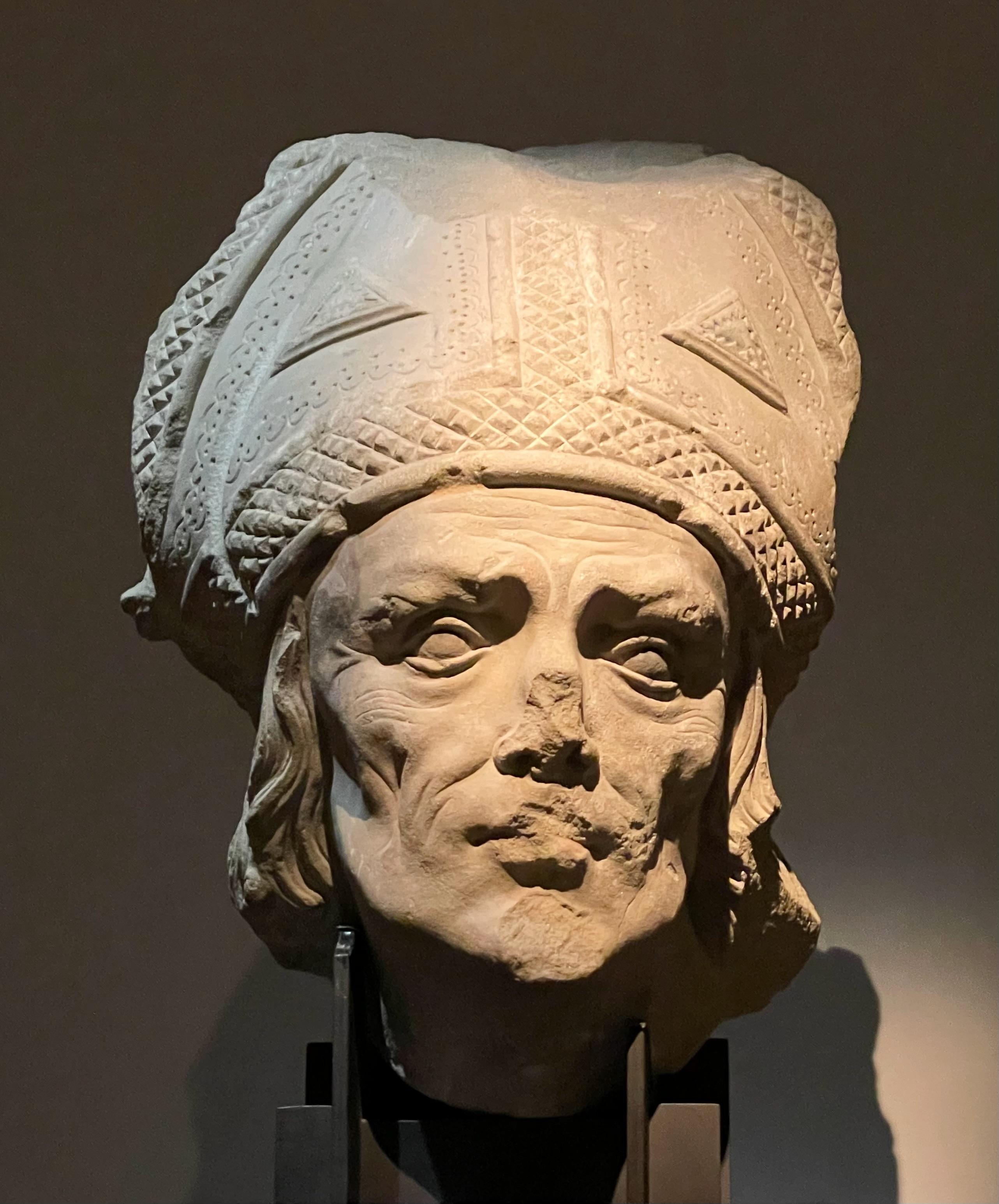
Bishop's head attributed to Albrecht, Bern Historical Museum

Sculptures unearthed on the Münsterplattform in 1986 provided new evidence for identifying Albrecht's work. Research following the discovery identified Albrecht with the Bartholomäusmeister and placed his artistic training in Tilman Riemenschneider's workshop in Würzburg. Among the pieces subsequently attributed to him is the head of a bishop. He has also been connected on stylistic grounds with several carved keystones made for the choir vault of Bern Minster in 1517.

=== Later work and style ===
Albrecht's last documented commission dates from 1529–1531, when he made the Fischbrunnen for Solothurn. The fountain was destroyed in 1602. Around 1500, he helped shift Bernese sculpture away from the Westphalian tradition associated with Erhart Küng toward a Franconian style with greater emphasis on naturalistic figures. Albrecht is regarded as one of the leading late-Gothic sculptors active in Bern, alongside Matthäus Ensinger and Erhart Küng.
