= The Perils of "Privilege" =

2017 book

- Author: Phoebe Maltz Bovy
- Language: English
- Subject: Identity politics, white privilege
- Publisher: St. Martin's Press
- Publication date: March 2017
- Pages: 324 pp
- ISBN: 978-1-250-09120-8 (hardcover)

The Perils of "Privilege": Why Injustice Can't Be Solved by Accusing Others of Advantage is a 2017 non-fiction book by Phoebe Maltz Bovy, a Toronto-based author.

== Overview ==
A look into the concept of "privilege" and how it affects progressive politics and that accusing others of unearned advantages does nothing to address inequality and perhaps only makes things worse.
