= M. J. Nurenberger =

Polish-born Canadian journalist and newspaper publisher

- Born: Meyer Joshua Nurenberger; January 4, 1911; Kraków, Austria-Hungary
- Died: August 11, 2001 (aged 90)
- Occupations: Journalist, newspaper editor, publisher and author
- Known for: Co-founder of The Canadian Jewish News
- Spouse: Dorothy Cohn Nurenberger
- Children: 3, including Atara Beck

Meyer Joshua Nurenberger (January 4, 1911 – August 11, 2001) was a Polish-born Canadian journalist, author and newspaper publisher. His career extended from the 1930s into the 1990s and included work as a parliamentary reporter, war correspondent and editor of several Yiddish and English-language newspapers. With his wife, Dorothy Cohn Nurenberger, he founded The Canadian Jewish News in 1960.

== Early life and career ==
Nurenberger was born into a Jewish family in Kraków in 1911. He subsequently lived in France and was educated in Belgium, where he began his journalism career as a parliamentary reporter. Anticipating the danger facing European Jews, he moved to the United States in February 1939. He urged his parents and three sisters to accompany him, but they declined, and he never saw them again.

In New York, Nurenberger received rabbinic ordination from Rabbi Yehuda Gershuni, although he did not use the title of rabbi. He worked for the Jewish Morning Journal, a New York-based Yiddish daily, and became its editor in 1947. He also wrote the principal editorial column for the New York Yiddish weekly Algemeiner Journal and contributed Hebrew- and French-language articles to publications in Israel and France. During his career, he interviewed Albert Einstein and was reportedly fluent in ten languages.

During World War II, Nurenberger served as a captain and war correspondent in the United States Army. While stationed in Europe, he issued travel documents that helped more than 100 Jews escape the Holocaust. He subsequently covered the Nuremberg trials and the trial of Adolf Eichmann in Israel.

== Career in Canada ==
In 1957, at the suggestion of his friend Menachem Begin, Nurenberger moved with his family from New York to Toronto to edit the Yiddish weekly Der Yiddishe Journal. After its offices burned down in 1959, he and his wife, Dorothy Cohn Nurenberger, decided to establish an English-language Jewish newspaper. They received assistance from local socialist leader Kalman Berger and, to a lesser extent, Toronto Telegram publisher John Bassett.

While preparing the first issue, the Nurenbergers received repeated death threats and a swastika was painted on their garage. For a time, their eldest daughter required a police escort while walking to school. The first issue of The Canadian Jewish News appeared in January 1960. The couple published the newspaper for more than a decade, with Dorothy contributing popular columns about theatre and the arts.

Nurenberger was a committed supporter of Herut and later Likud. His political associates included Begin, Yitzhak Rabin and former Canadian prime minister John Diefenbaker, whom he advised on Middle Eastern affairs. According to historian Irving Abella, Nurenberger was among the earliest Canadian political commentators to criticize the federal government's indifference toward Nazi war criminals living in Canada.

Following Dorothy's death, Nurenberger sold The Canadian Jewish News in 1971 to a consortium of three private owners. The new owners moderated the newspaper's political tone and transformed it into a broader communal publication. Nurenberger disagreed strongly with its new direction, although its circulation eventually increased more than tenfold.

In 1974, Nurenberger founded the Jewish Times, which he used to publish his political and editorial views and to criticize his former publication. The newspaper continued into the early 1990s but never achieved a large circulation.

Nurenberger also founded and edited the French-language Jewish monthly magazine Nouveau Monde, which was distributed in Montreal during the late 1960s and early 1970s. In 1972, he appointed writer Victor Teboul as its editor-in-chief.

== Writing ==
Nurenberger wrote The Scared and the Doomed: The Jewish Establishment vs. the Six Million, published in 1985. Part memoir and part history, the book argued that internal divisions prevented the American Jewish community from taking effective collective action against the Holocaust.

Author Lewis Levendel devoted a chapter to Nurenberger in his 1989 book A Century of the Canadian Jewish Press: 1880s–1980s, describing him as a colourful, influential and fiercely independent figure in Canadian Jewish journalism.

== Personal life and death ==
Nurenberger and Dorothy had three daughters: Cynthia Berke, Ilana Ovadya and journalist Atara Beck. Dorothy and Cynthia predeceased him. Beck worked as a journalist for the Jewish Tribune and later became a writer for The Jerusalem Post.

Nurenberger developed Alzheimer's disease during the 1990s and died in 2001 at the age of 90. He was survived by Ilana, Atara, 11 grandchildren and one great-grandchild.
