= Bern Minster =

- Berner Münster
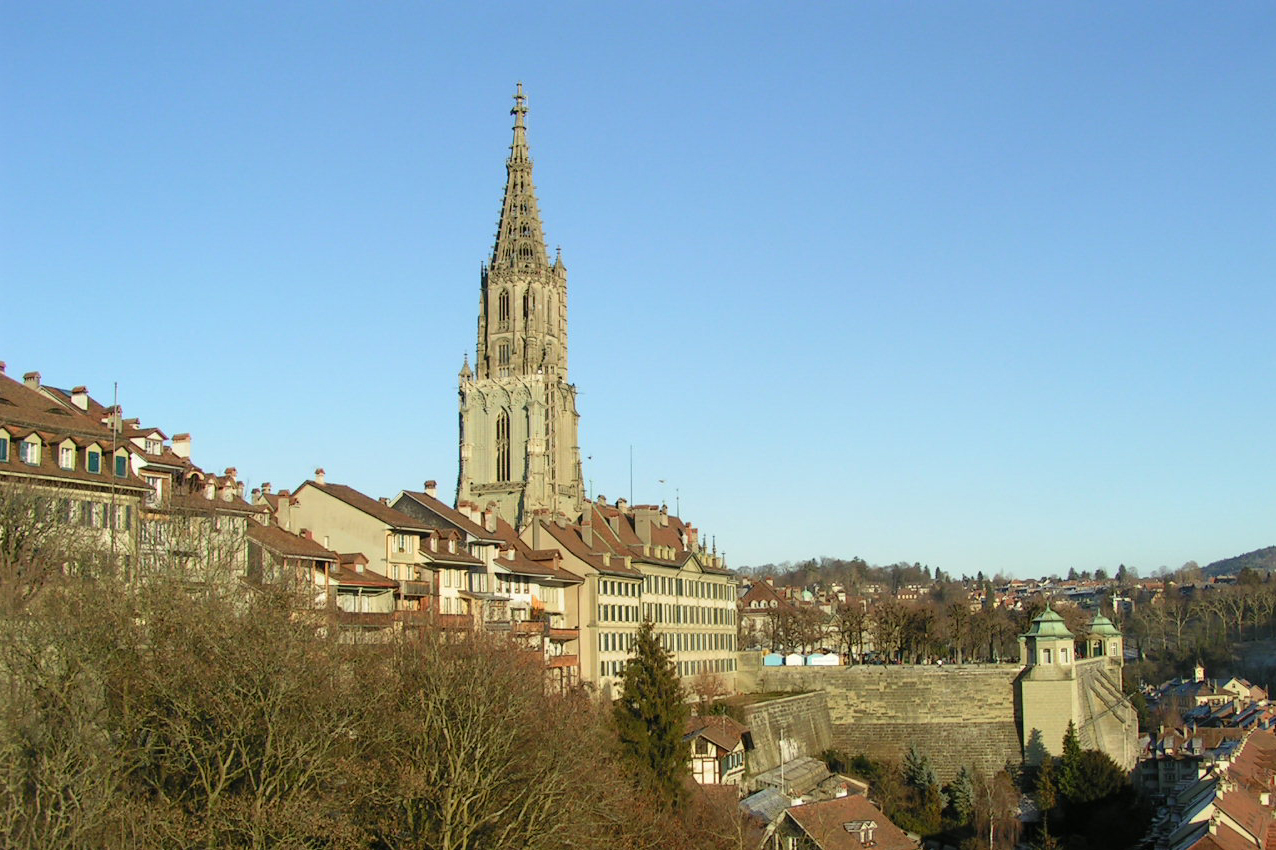
- Berner Münster viewed from Kirchenfeldbrücke.

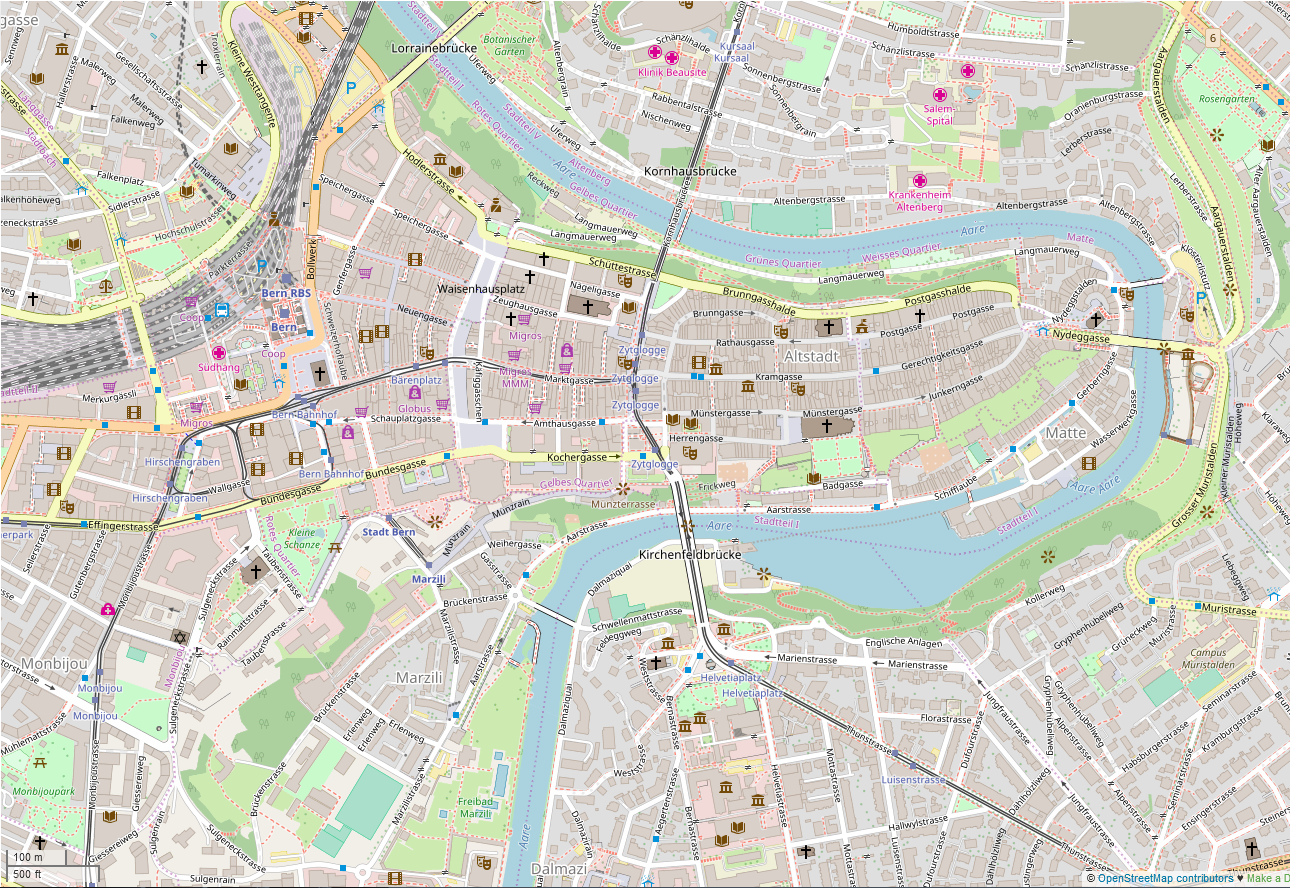
- 46°56′50″N 7°27′05″E
- Location: Bern, Canton of Bern
- Country: Switzerland
- Denomination: Swiss Reformed
- Previous denomination: Roman Catholic
- Website: www.bernermuenster.ch

History
- Former name: Cathedral of St. Vincent
- Status: Minster
- Founded: 11 March 1421
- Events: 1518 Rectangular tower completed 1575 Major construction ends 1528 Converted to the Reformation; 1783 Organ installed 1893 Bell tower completed

Architecture
- Functional status: Active
- Heritage designation: Swiss Inventory of Cultural Property of National and Regional Significance
- Architect: Matthäus Ensinger
- Architectural type: Cathedral
- Style: Gothic
- Completed: 1893

Specifications
- Length: 84.2 m (276 ft)
- Width: 33.68 m (110.5 ft)
- Height: 20.70 m (67.9 ft)
- Materials: Grey Sandstone

Bern Minster (German: Berner Münster) is a Swiss Reformed cathedral (or minster) in the old city of Bern, Switzerland. Built in the Gothic style, its construction started in 1421. Its tower, with a height of 100.6 m (330 ft), was only completed in 1893. It is the tallest cathedral in Switzerland and is a Cultural Property of National Significance.

== The building ==
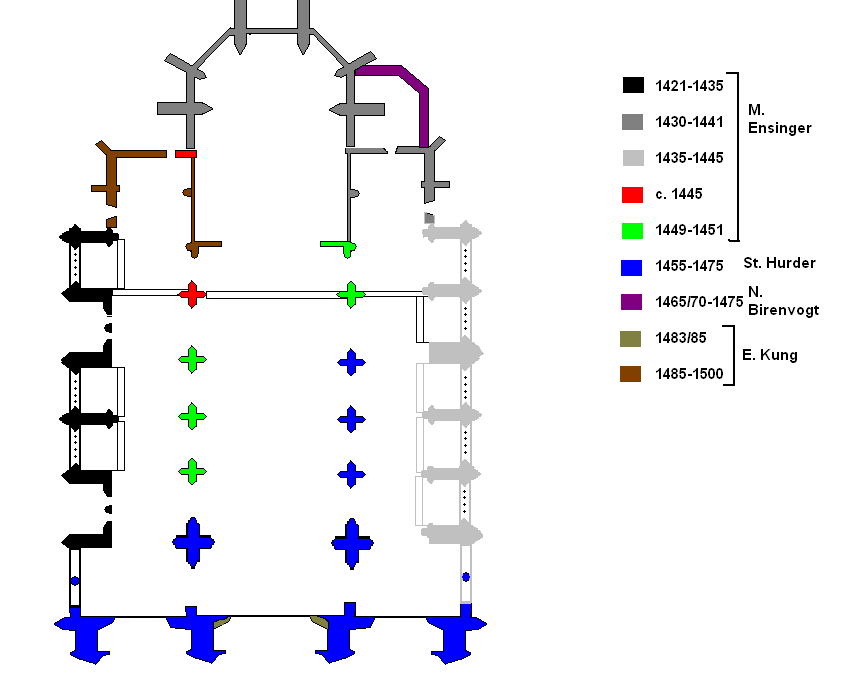
Plan of the cathedral, showing construction phases

The Minster of Bern is located on the southern side of the Aare peninsula. The cathedral is oriented east and west like the rest of the Old City of Bern. To the north, Münstergasse runs along the side of the building. The west façade of the Münster dominates Münsterplatz. On the south side of the cathedral is the Münsterplattform.

It is a three nave basilica without a transept. The entire cathedral is 84.2 meters (276 ft) long and 33.68 m (110.5 ft) wide. The central nave is 39.37 m (129.2 ft) long by 11.10 m (36.4 ft) wide and is 20.70 m (67.9 ft) high. The two side naves are very similar in dimensions, the north nave is 52.50 m (172.2 ft) long, while the southern one is slightly longer at 52.72 m (173.0 ft). They are both 6.45 m (21.2 ft) wide and 10.40 m (34.1 ft) high. The altar house and choir together are 25.20 m (82.7 ft) long, 10.92 m (35.8 ft) wide and 19.40 m (63.6 ft) high. The cathedral has a single tower in the west, which is 100.60 m (330.1 ft) high. Below the tower, there is a 10.15 m (33.3 ft) long by 10.46 m (34.3 ft) wide, tower hall.

There are a total of ten bays in the building. The central nave has five of these bays. Each of the side naves has two bays, with side chapels built against the exterior walls. The last bay is within the choir.

The central nave walls are supported by fourteen flying buttresses. Each buttress starts at a decorated column which rises above the roof of the side naves and side chapels. The buttresses rise at an angle of 43° 30’. The lower side of the buttresses are decorated with egg-shaped cut outs, with vesica piscis and spandrel designs.

The majority of the building is built from local sandstone. The vaults are built of brick. In the 18th century, limestone sheathing was added to the pillars. Most of the sandstone came from a quarry at Ostermundigen. Additional material came from three other quarries, each with differing colour and quality. The various stone types were used more or less randomly throughout the entire building. The pillar bases, capitals, windows and sculptures are all from the highest quality, blue sandstone from the Gurten quarry, south of Bern. During reconstruction projects in the 19th and 20th centuries, several other sandstone types were used.

=== West façade and tower ===
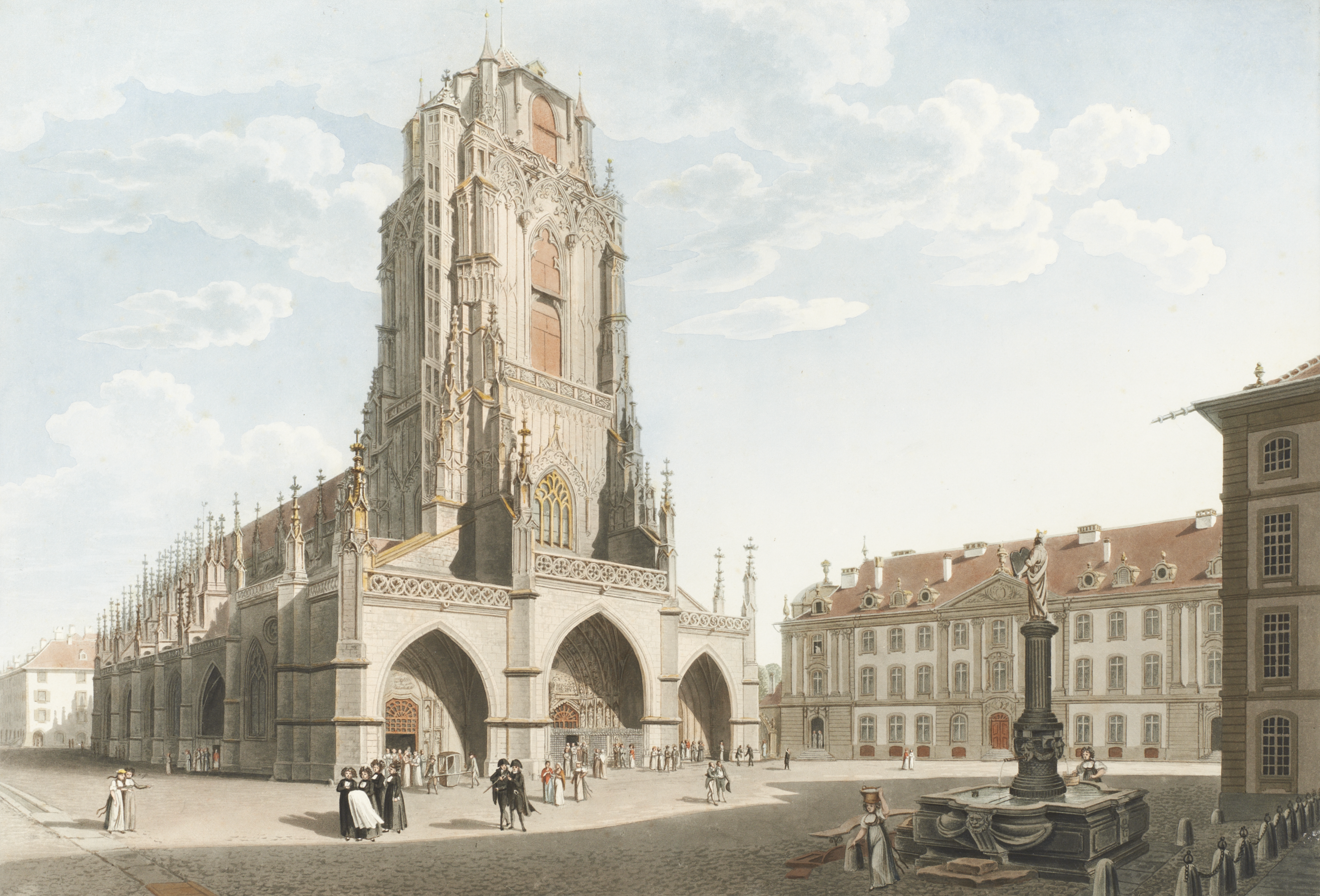
Minster in 1800, before the upper tower was finished

The three west entrances of the cathedral are located at the back of three large portals. Each of the portals is a different height and differently shaped and decorated. The central portal is decorated with a series of statues that represent the Last Judgment in Christian theology.

The bell tower grew in several stages. The lower, rectangular tower was the original tower. The octagonal upper tower was added in the 19th century. The lower tower is flanked by two round towers and eight pillars. To the north and south, it is supported by buttresses that rise above the northern and southern main portals. The west face of the tower rises above a gallery above the central, west portal. The east face is supported by the central nave. The decoration on the western face of the tower has changed several times over the centuries. The lower, western window is quite short but wide.

The upper section of the rectangular tower rises above a second gallery. It has a 12 m (39 ft) high, but narrow window directly above the gallery. The decorations of this section are the work of two master stonemasons, Erhart Küng and Burkhart Engelberg This section shows much less variation in the design as it was built completely under the direction of these two men. The original tower was capped with a pyramidal roof, elements of which still exist.

The two small, stairway towers were built as part of the tower, but were completely rebuilt in the 17th and 18th centuries.

The lower octagonal tower was built in the 16th century. It has eight, round arch windows. Two hexagonal staircase towers are built outside the tower near the northeast and southeast windows. The small towers are completely self-supporting.

The upper octagonal tower was built in the 19th century in a gothic style. However, some of the ornamentation is based on early 15th century designs and stands out against the 16th century lower octagonal tower.

== History ==
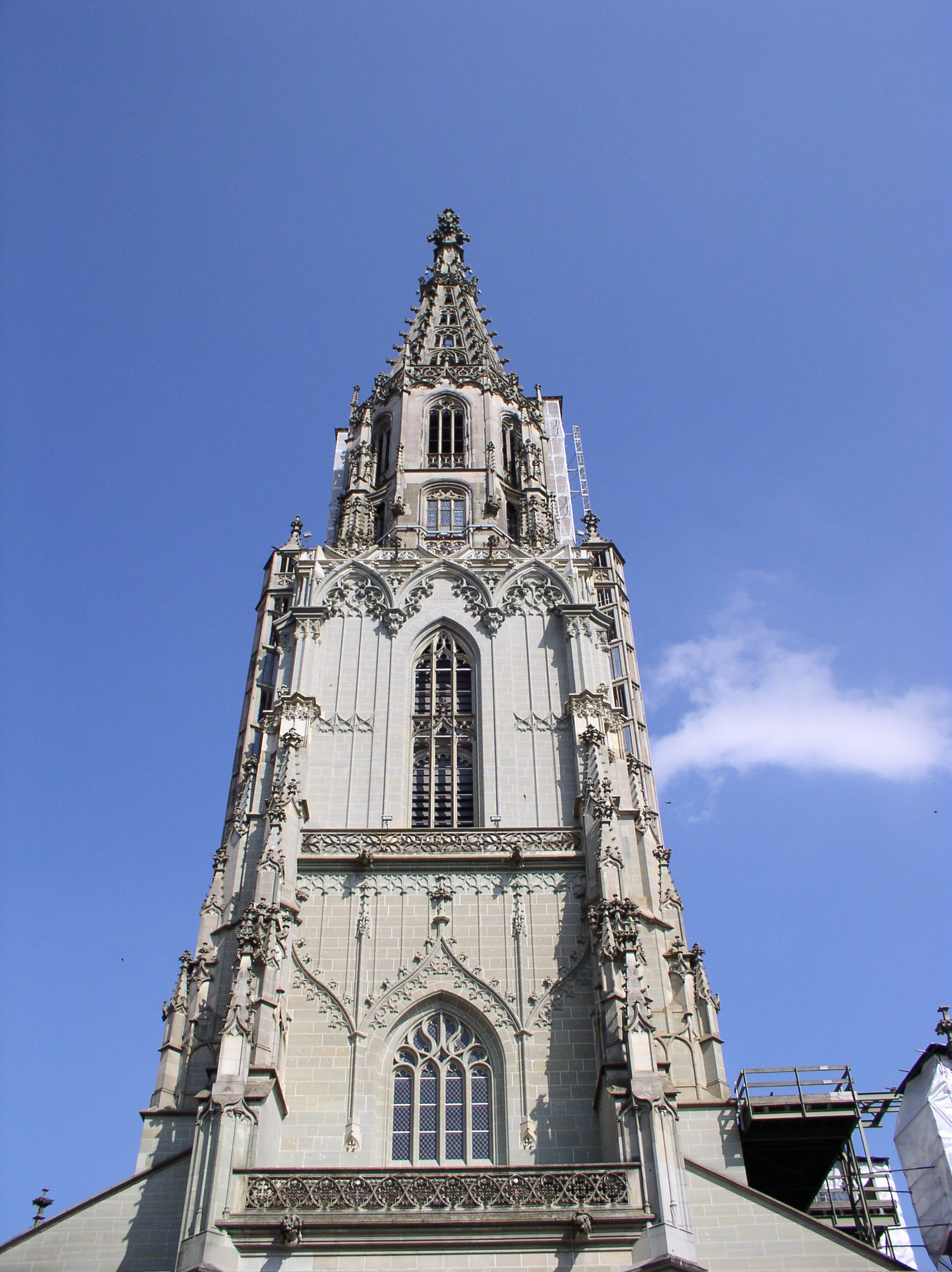
View of the tower showing the lower and upper octagons

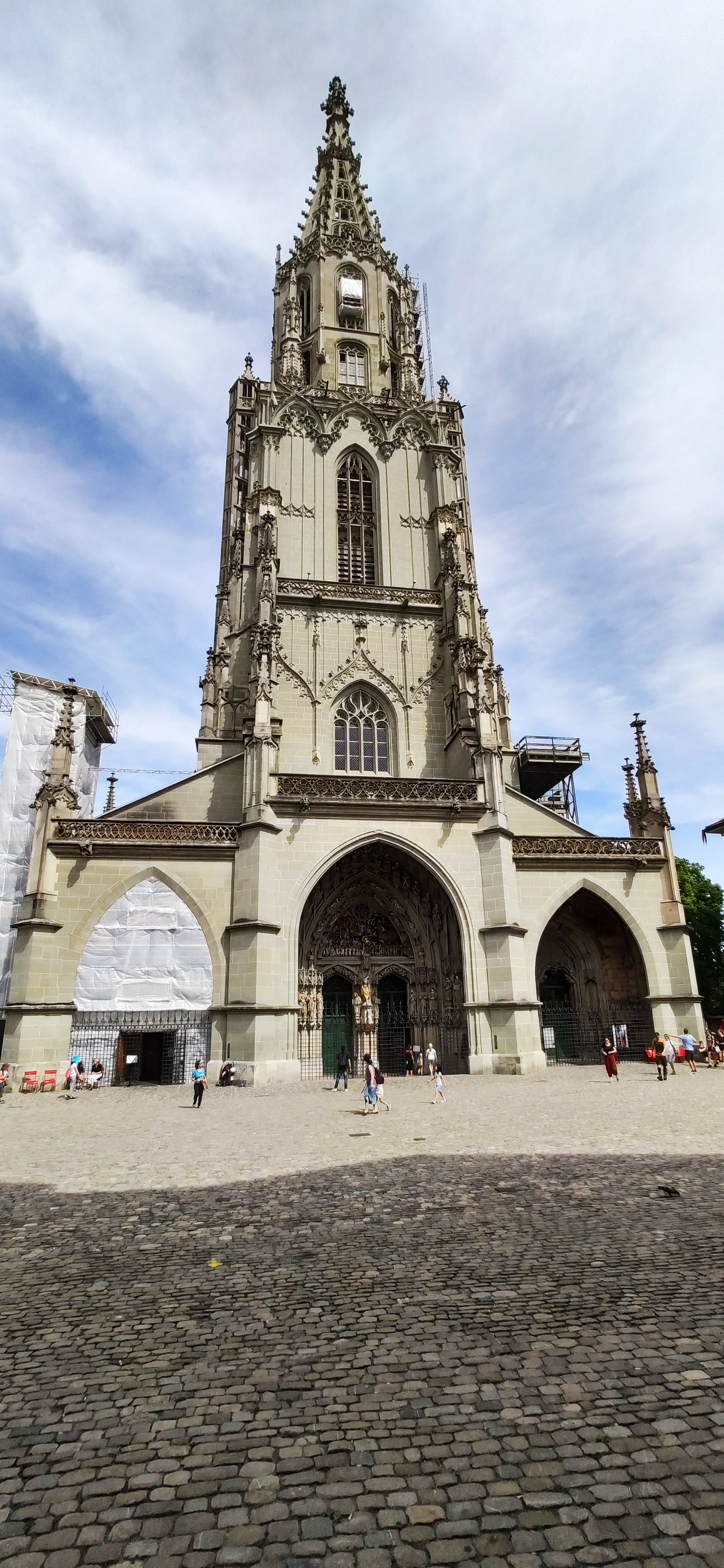
Front view of the Bern cathedral during outside renovations

The first church on this site probably was a small chapel (Leutkirche) built during the founding of Bern (1191). The first church of Bern was a romanesque building which was probably built between 1155 and 1160, but is first mentioned in 1224. This church was outside the city walls, near what is now Kreuzgasse. The nave of the first church was about 16.5 m (54 ft) long by 6 m (20 ft) wide.

In 1276, Bern broke away from the parish of Köniz to become an independent parish. For this new role, a larger church would have been necessary. It appears likely that construction on the second church began immediately. However, it isn't mentioned until 1289 in writings of Bishop Benvenutus von Eugubio. This new church was a three nave building, with a length of 29.5 m (97 ft), a width of 24.5 m (80 ft) of which the middle nave was 11.1 m (36 ft) wide. The bell tower was located in the middle of the northern side nave, and filled part of the central nave.

The 1356 Basel earthquake caused extensive damage to the church walls, arches, and tower. Repairs proceeded slowly. The choir was rebuilt in 1359 and the roof was rebuilt in 1378–80. During the early stages of construction of the Minster, this church was still being used. The nave was finally demolished between 1449–51 and the tower remained until 1493.

By the 15th century, Bern had expanded and become a major city-state north of the Alps. To celebrate their growing power and wealth, plans were made to build a new and larger church. On 11 March 1421 construction began on the cathedral under the direction of the Strasbourg master builder Matthäus Ensinger, who had already built three other cathedrals. During construction, services were held in the old chapel while the new cathedral was built up around it. During the 1440s the unvaulted choir was used for services after a simple roof was built and stained glass windows were installed. After the Old Zürich War 1440–1446 the nave of the old chapel was removed and work began on the nave and west end, under the chief masons Stefan Hurder and then Niklaus Birenvogt.

In 1483 Erhart Küng (who carved the statues of the Last Judgement) became the master mason. Under his direction the nave walls were raised and the tower was built to the lower octagon. Construction on the lower rectangular tower began in 1481 or 1483 and continued until 1489. The upper rectangular section was built between 1489 and 1518. Following Küng's death in 1506, Peter Pfister led the construction and finished the vaulting in the choir. The lower octagonal tower and roof were finished between 1518 and 1521. In 1571 Daniel Heintz was brought in as master mason to finish vaulting the nave and finish the work. The central nave was finished by 1575 and at this point, construction stopped for almost three centuries. The organ was installed in three stages between 1727 and 1783. The bell tower, with the largest bell in Switzerland, wasn't completed until 1893.

=== The Reformation in Bern ===
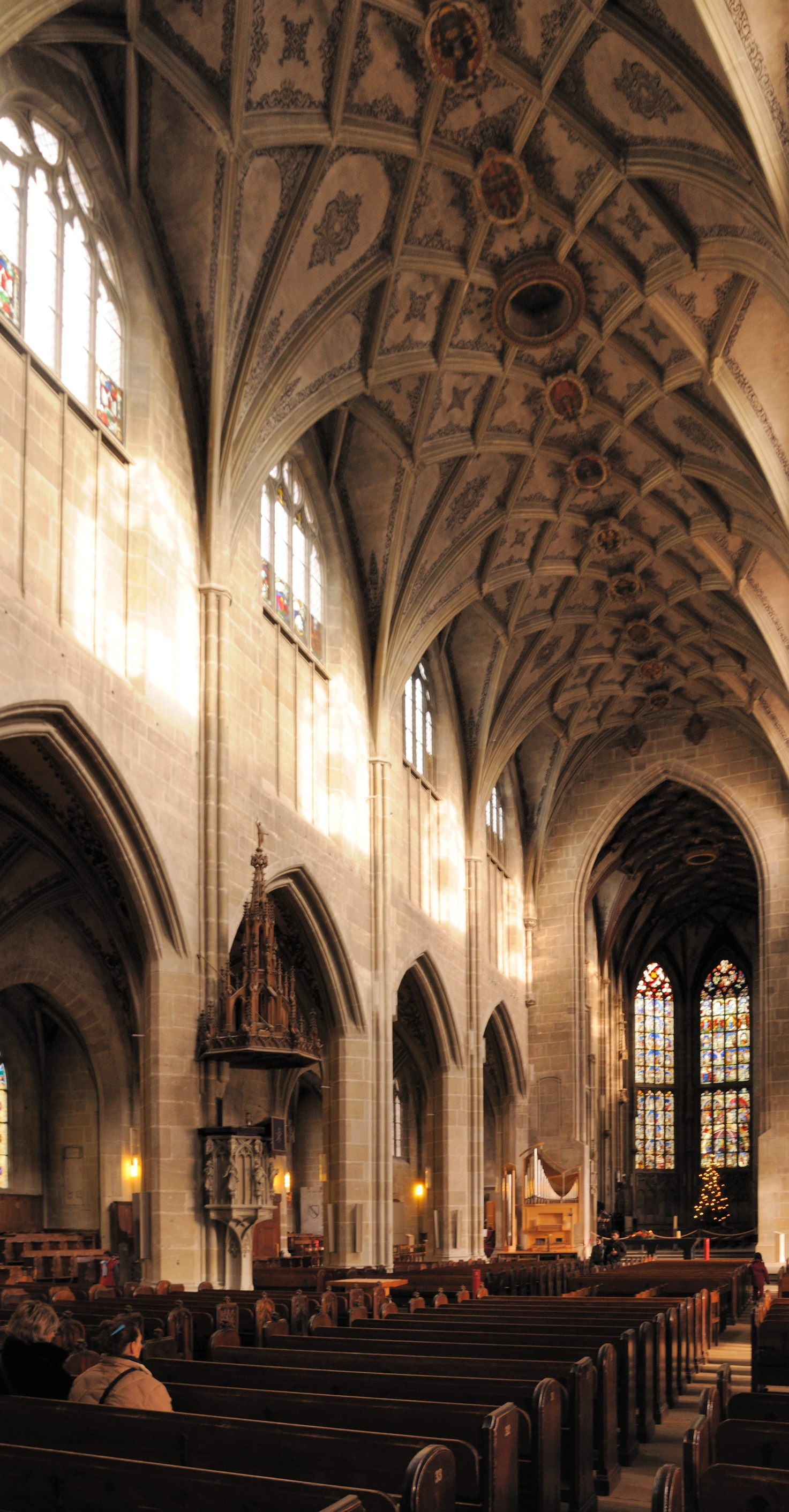
The interior of the Minster has been very austere since the iconoclasm of the 16th century

In 1515, Thomas Wyttenbach, Huldrych Zwingli's teacher, became a priest at the Minster of Bern. In the latter part of Wyttenbach's stay in Bern, a local priest, Berchtold Haller, lived with him. Around the time that Wyttenbach left Bern in 1520 to become a Reformer of his birthplace, Biel, Haller was elected a canon of the cathedral. In 1521, he became friends with Zwingli in Zurich and began to preach more Protestant sermons. In February, 1522, two Fastnacht plays were given at Bern, which attacked the Catholic Church. Due to the rising reformist sentiment, in June 1523, the city council ordered that the words of the Bible should be preached. By 20 November of that year, the nuns left the convent in Bern. But in 1524 the priest Meier, who sympathized with Haller, was compelled to leave Bern. That left Haller the only Protestant among the priests. Then, on 7 April 1525, the council issued a new decree restoring the Catholic worship, though with a few changes.

In the following year, the plague came to Bern. The deaths due to the plague converted many of the citizens to the Reformation. In 1527 the Reformed party gained the control of the great council, and it ordered that the new faith should be preached. Still there was a conflict about the mass, as some congregations still observed it. It was decided that there should be a religious disputation at Bern, on 6 January 1528, to settle these questions.

On 27 January 1528, the council ordered that throughout the city, all masses should be stopped and all icons should be cast out. On 7 February 1528, it ordered the same for the whole canton. In April 1528, a Protestant service was first celebrated in the Minster. Today's congregation forms part of the Reformed Churches of the Canton Bern-Jura-Solothurn.

== The Last Judgement ==
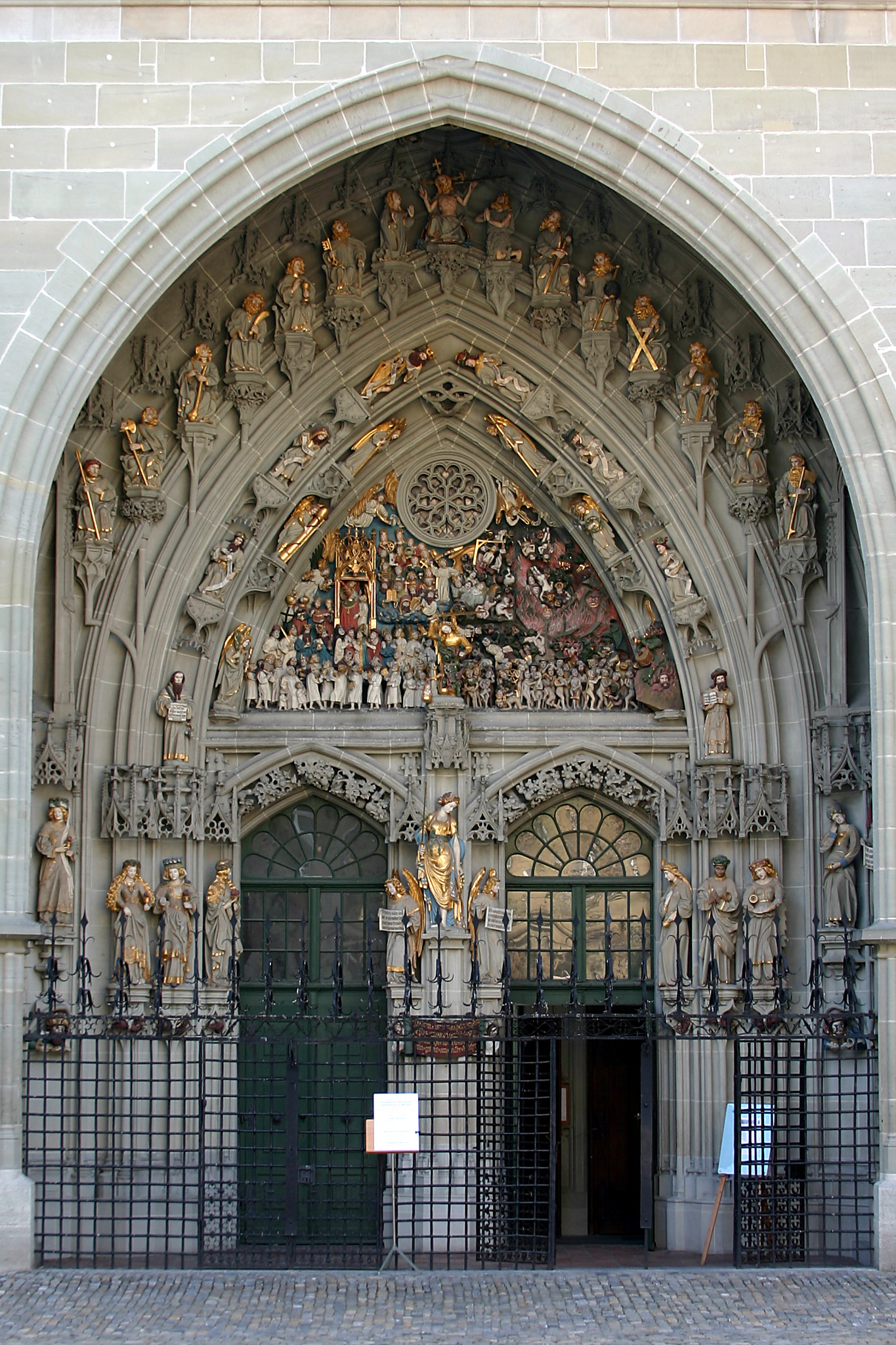
Main entrance

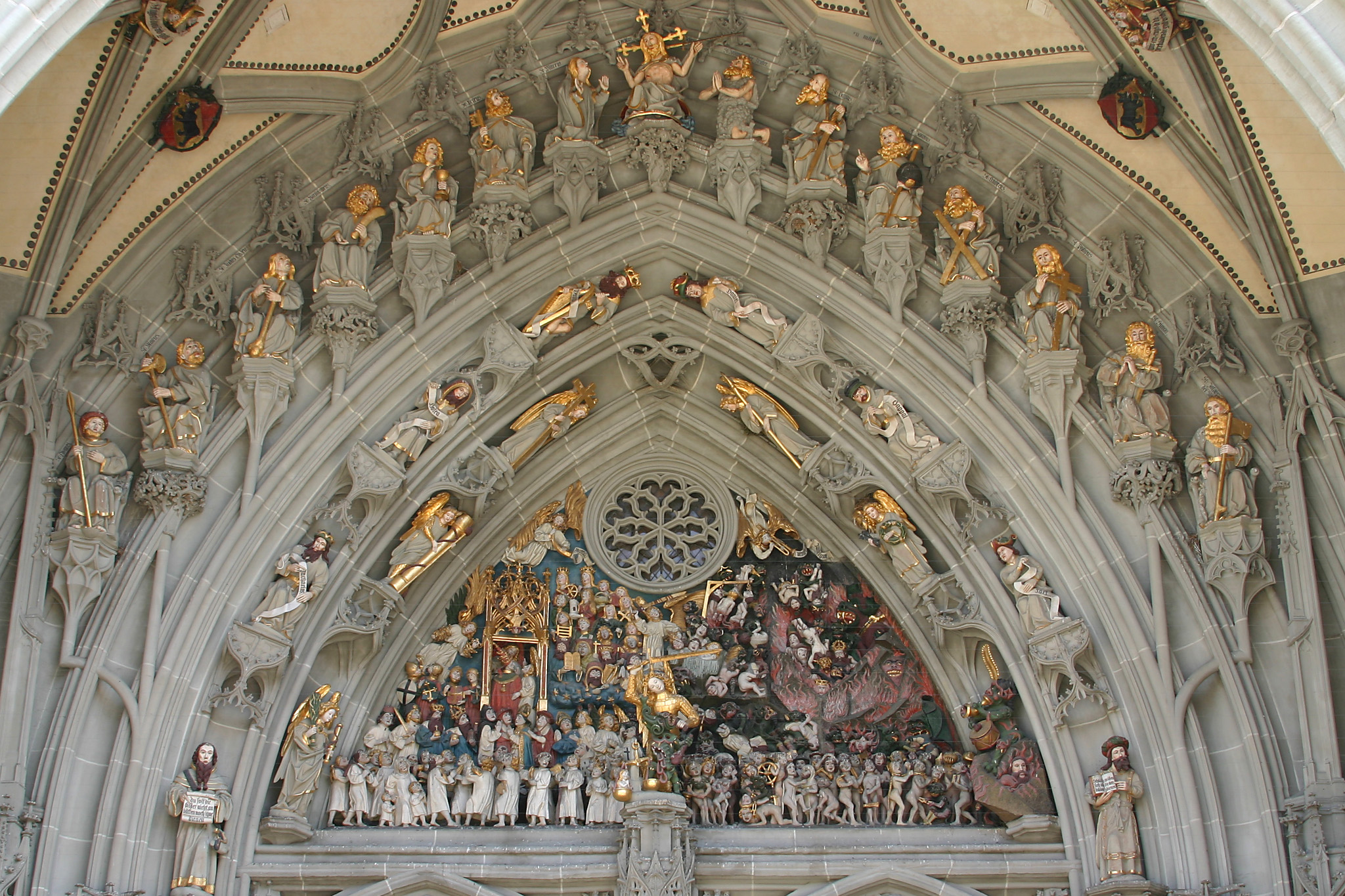
Details of the Last Judgement.

Over the main portal is one of the most complete Late Gothic sculpture collections in Europe. This collection represents the Christian belief in a Last Judgment where the wicked will be separated from the righteous. This sculpture shows the wicked naked on the right, while the righteous stand clothed in white on the left. In the center is Justice, with Saints and the wise and foolish virgins around her. In the centre stands Michael the Archangel with a raised sword.

The sculptures of the Last Judgement were the only statues in the Minster to survive the iconoclasm of the Protestant Reformation. The 47 large free-standing statues are replicas (the originals are in Bern History Museum), and the 170 smaller figures are all original. The Last Judgement was the work of one sculptor, Erhard Küng from Stadtlohn, Westphalia, which gives the collection a unity of design. The Justice sculpture is the only one that was done by another artist. It is signed by Daniel Heintz, who was the master builder after 1571. The rest of the statues were carved some time between 1460 and 1501, most likely between 1460 and 1480.

The trumeau to each side and between the doors has thirteen life-size figures. The middle figure and the two figures on each side of the door are raised by about half their height above the other figures. The figures on the left of the door represent the five Foolish Virgins while the ones on the right are the Wise Virgins. Below the outer two Wise Virgins and the two Foolish Virgins, two faces peer out of the wall on each side. On the wise side, they represent the Queen of Sheba and King Solomon. On the foolish side, they represent Zephaniah and, maybe, Isaiah. In the center, between the two doors, is Justice flanked by two angels. Below Justice and the angels is a scroll commemorating the laying of the cornerstone in 1421.

The archivolt features three rows of figures. The inner two rows are attached to the wall and lie at an angle which follows the curve of the portal. The outer, third row features statues that stand upright on individual platforms. The inner row contains five angels with the instruments of the Passion. The second row contains eight Old Testament prophets. The outer row is Jesus, Mary and the Apostles, including John the Baptist and Paul, but not Judas Iscariot.

The tympanum is 4.75 m (15.6 ft) wide at the base. It is made up of thirteen individual sections. The bottom row is made up of three plates located about 10 cm (3.9 in) above the lintel. It is 38 cm (15 in) deep and about 50–60 cm (20–24 in) high. On the left side of the tympanum, it contains two rows of figures and on the right, three. The lower figures are nearly fully three-dimensional, while the upper figures are mostly carved in relief, with only the head and shoulders projecting out of the stone. Above these three plates, the remaining ten plates are arraigned in three rows. The bottom row is made up of four plates which rest on a 30–40 cm (12–16 in) high base. The plates are high relief carvings, each about 38 cm (15 in) deep and an average of about 1 m (3.3 ft) high. The figures were all carved with a rock pick. In the center of the tympanum is the Archangel Michael. He stands on his platform which is projected forward from the rest of the figures. The entire tympanum represents Heaven and Hell in the Last Judgment.

== Interior ==
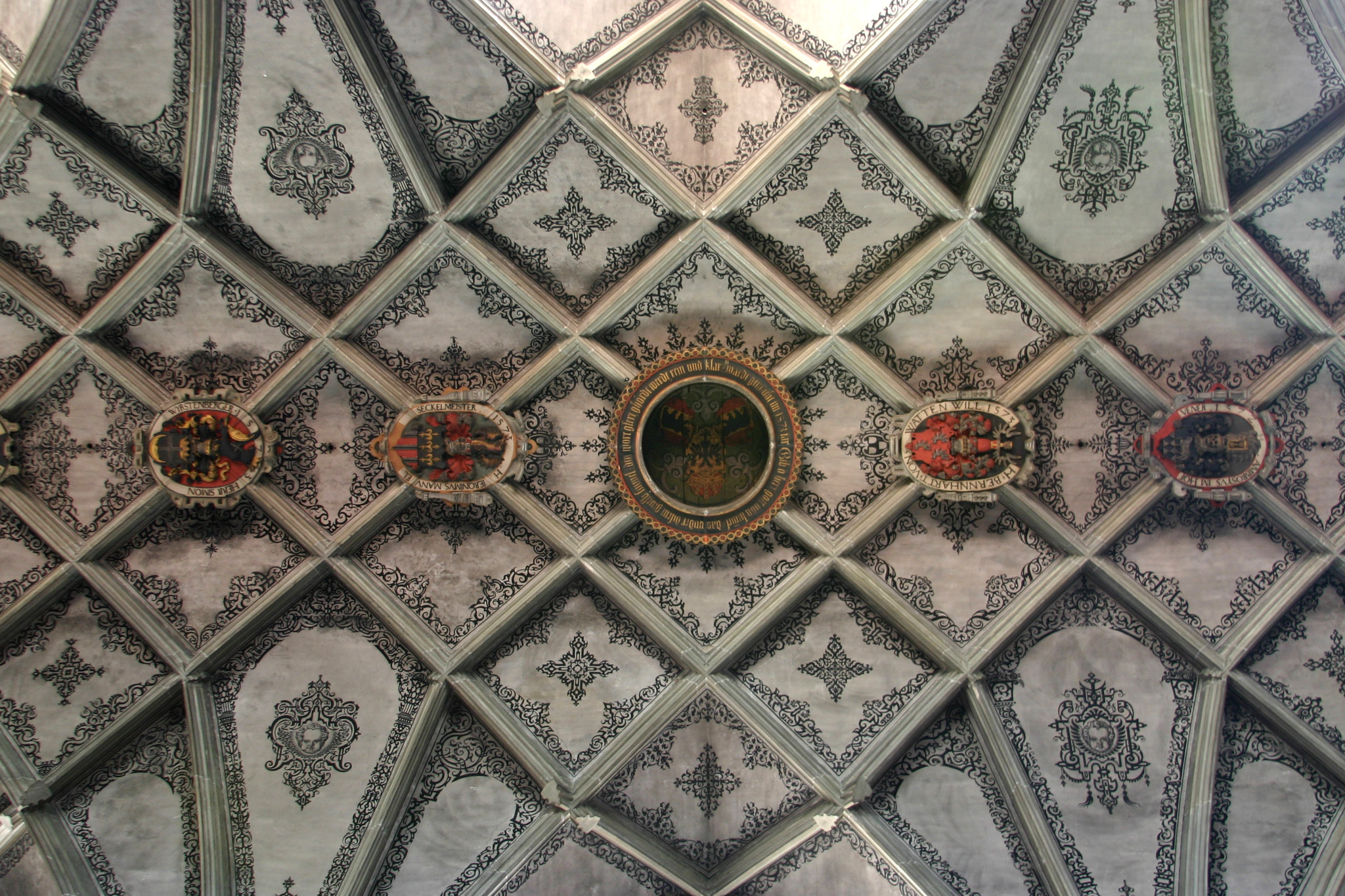
A view of the vaulted ceiling of showing the extensive lace-like structure

The Minster was built by the city of Bern as a symbol of the growing power of this city-state. The interior was therefore designed to awe the citizens as well as foreign visitors. The central nave was built in a lacy gothic style with enormous stained glass windows and numerous altars in side chapels. The Gothic style allowed a taller central nave and larger windows than had been possible before, creating an impressive and (for the time) light and airy structure.

=== Altars ===
Many altars were financed by local families, creating a wealth of art and sculpture in the cathedral. However, in 1528 all 43 side altars were removed during the iconoclasm of the Protestant Reformation. Nearly all the interior paintings and decorations were removed and dumped in the neighboring Münsterplattform. The empty chapels were filled with extra pews, creating three naves. Since that time, the interior of the cathedral has remained relatively empty and austere.

=== Stained glass ===
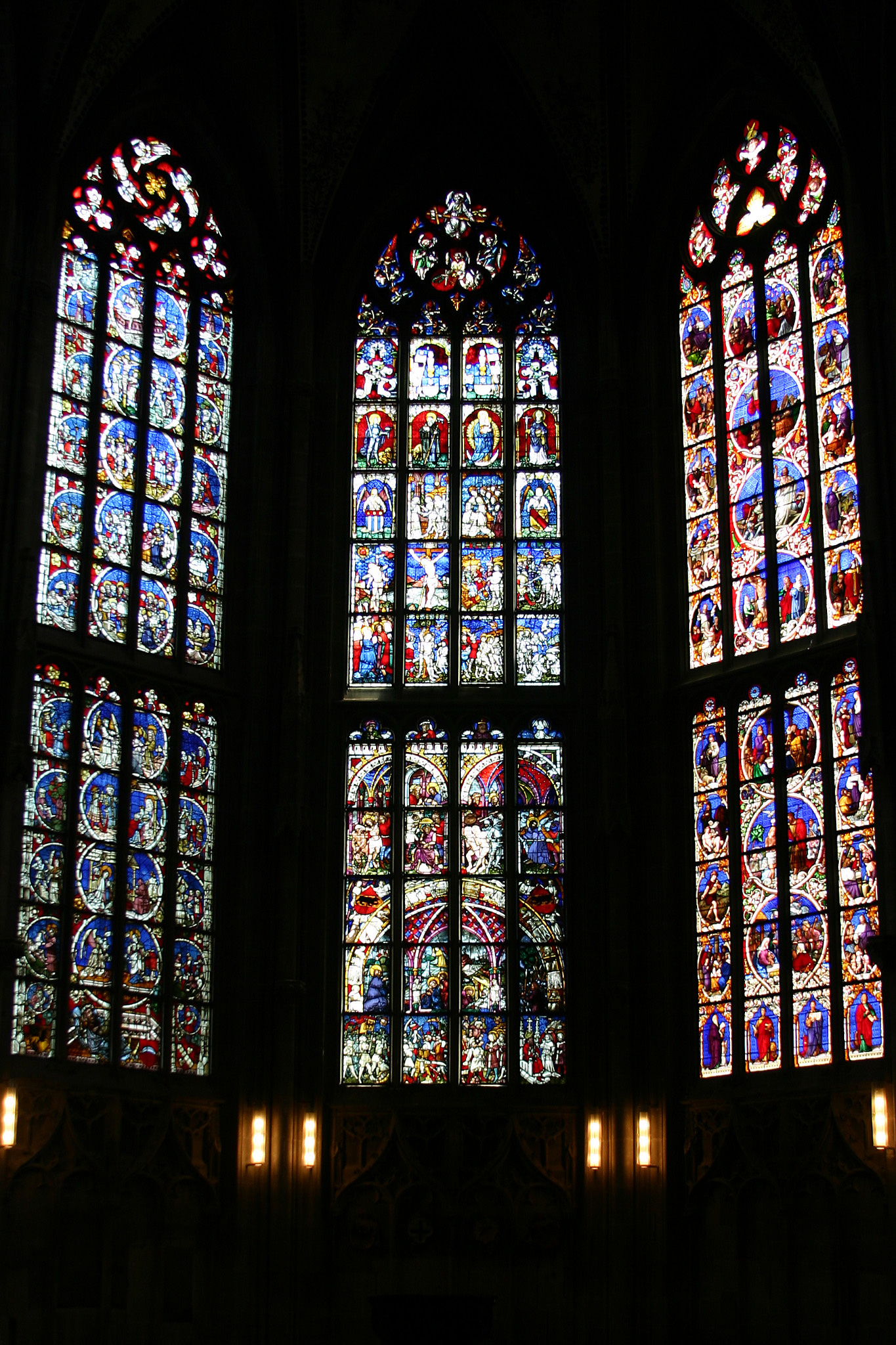
Bible scenes, Passion/Ten thousand martyrs and Christ windows in the choir

The stained glass windows of the cathedral are considered the most valuable in Switzerland. Some of the windows date from 1441 to 1450. The right hand windows were damaged during a hailstorm in 1520 and replaced in 1868. Many of the windows include both heraldic symbols and religious images placed side by side. The windows are 2.92 m (9 ft 7 in) wide in the middle and 13.15 m (43 ft 2 in) high. Most of the windows have twenty lower panels, each 61 cm (24 in) by 92 cm (36 in), and twenty upper panels, each 61 cm (24 in) by 105 cm (41 in).

There are seven windows in the choir of the Minster. Some of the panels have been moved or replaced since the windows were originally built. Facing the choir, from left to right, the current windows are: Hostienmühle, Three Kings, Bible scenes, Passion/Ten thousand martyrs, Christ, Stephanus and Coat of Arms windows. Only portions of the Passion and Ten thousand martyrs windows remain, so they were combined into a single window. The Christ window was added to replace the damaged Ten thousand martyrs window. The Stephanus and Coat of Arms windows replaced earlier, unknown windows.

The Hostienmühle window was built between 1448 and 1453 and was funded by the city of Bern. The Three Kings window was built between 1447 and 1455 for Rudolf von Ringoltingen, possibly in Constance or the Oberrhein region. The Bible scenes window was originally supposed to be just of the young Christ but was changed after 1447. It was built between 1448 and 1451 and was funded by three members of the Gesellschaft zum Mittellöwen. The Passion window was built between 1438 and 1441. Only 21 panels of the original window remain. It was built for the city through the Schultheiß by Hans Acker in Ulm. The Ten thousand martyrs window was originally supposed to be of the Resurrection of Jesus, but that was changed after 1447. It was built between 1447 and 1449 and was funded by donations from the citizens of Bern. It was built by Master Painter Bernhart and glazier Niklaus Magerfritz in Bern. The Ten thousand martyrs window was replaced in 1868 by the Christ window. The Stephanus window replaced an earlier window in 1868. The theme of the original window is unknown but it was built in 1449–1451 for Kaspar von Scharnachtal, probably by Niklaus Magerfritz in Bern. The Coat of Arms window was built in 1820–30 to replace an earlier, unknown window.

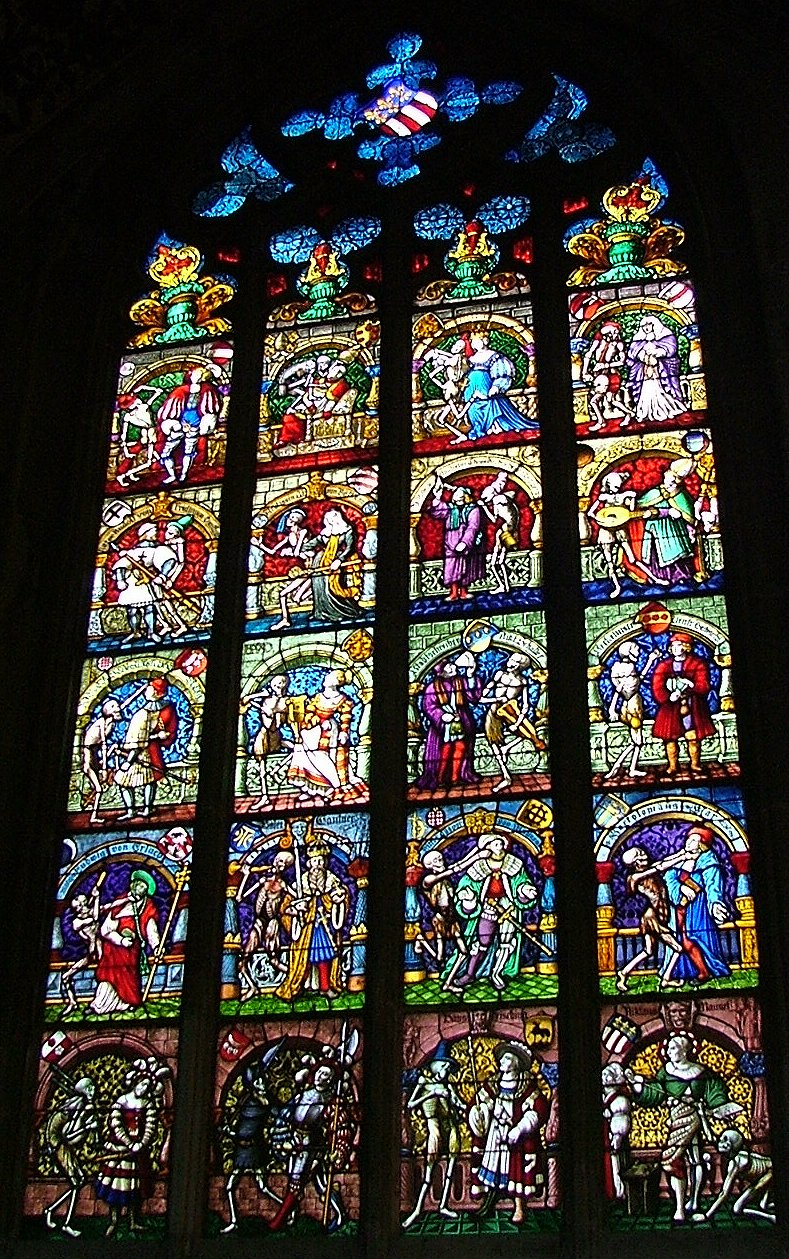
Dance of Death stained glass window. Images of death claiming people from all walks of life were very common during the Black Plague in Europe.

One very interesting window is the "Dance of Death" window located near the choir on the south side nave. The first Dance of Death plays originated during the Black Death of the 14th century and remained popular during the 14th and 15th century. By 1425, the figures from the plays appeared in the cemetery of the Church of the Holy Innocents in Paris. The figures on the Münster window were done by Niklaus Manuel between 1516 and 1519. The stained glass window in the cathedral is an excellent example of this theme. The window shows death, in the form of a skeleton, claiming people from every station in life. The Dance of Death served to remind the viewer that death will happen to everyone regardless of station or wealth.

=== Choir stalls ===
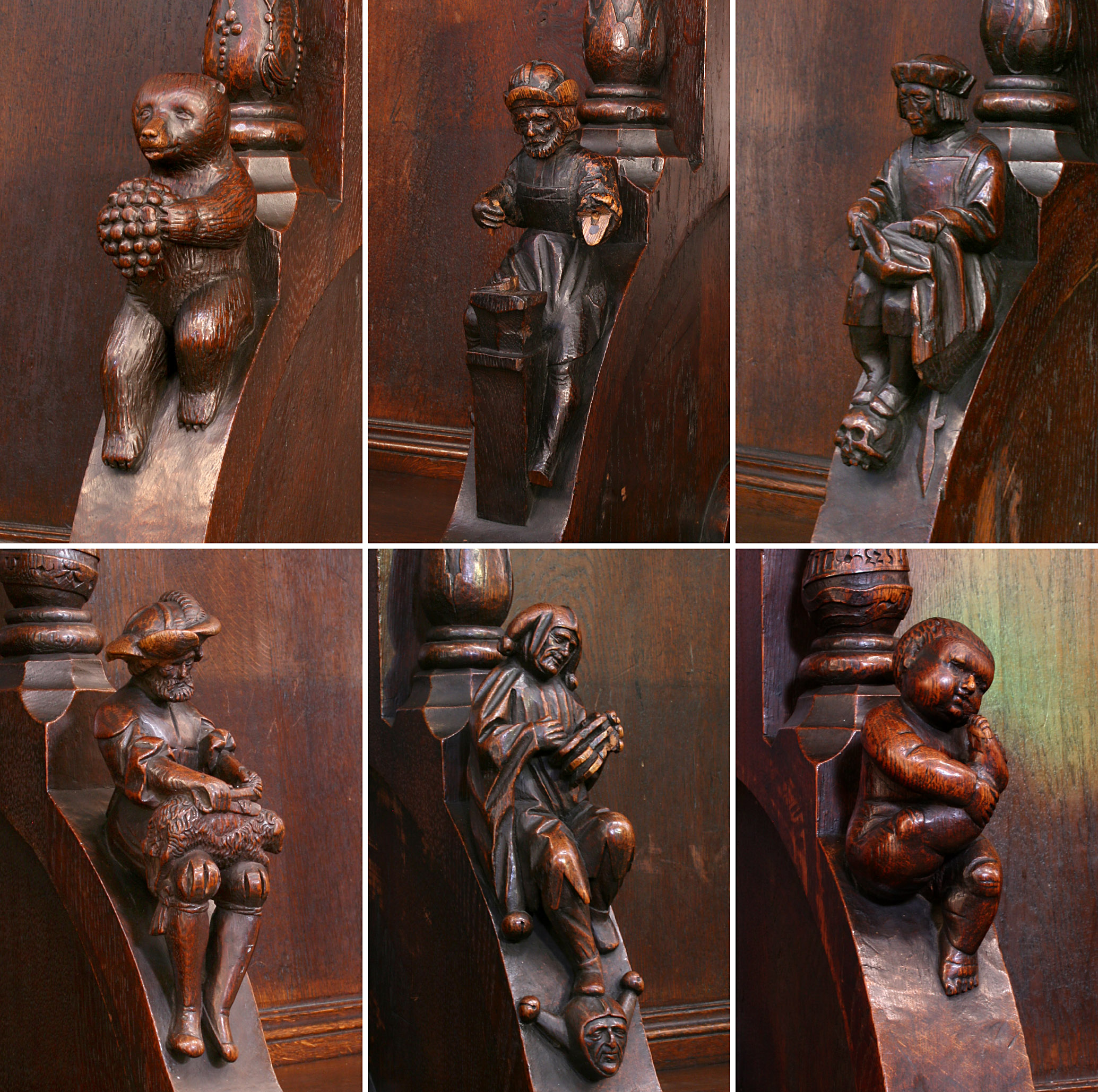
Carved figures on some of the choir stalls

The choir, in the eastern side of the cathedral between the nave and the sanctuary, houses the first Renaissance choir stalls in Switzerland. There are 21 seats on the Evangelisten side and 27 on the Epistel side. The stalls are richly carved with both animals and images of daily life.

In 1517, the town council hired Bernhard Burenfind from Solothurn to build the stalls. He began selecting and cutting oak wood for the stalls. However, for an unknown reason, he did not complete the work and was not asked to complete any other projects in Bern. On 26 September 1522, Bern tried to hire a master carpenter from Schaffhausen for 30 pounds. In the same year, Niklaus Manuel and three others were sent to Geneva to examine the choir stalls there. On 5 December 1522, Jacob Ruess and Heini Seewagen from Schaffhausen were hired to complete the work on the stalls. They were paid much more than the 30 pounds that Bern had wanted to pay. They were paid 300 pounds in 1522, followed by 150 in the next year, 300 in 1524. They finished the work in 1525. The original stalls were repaired and renovated in 1863–64 and the carvings were repaired in 1897.

=== Organ ===
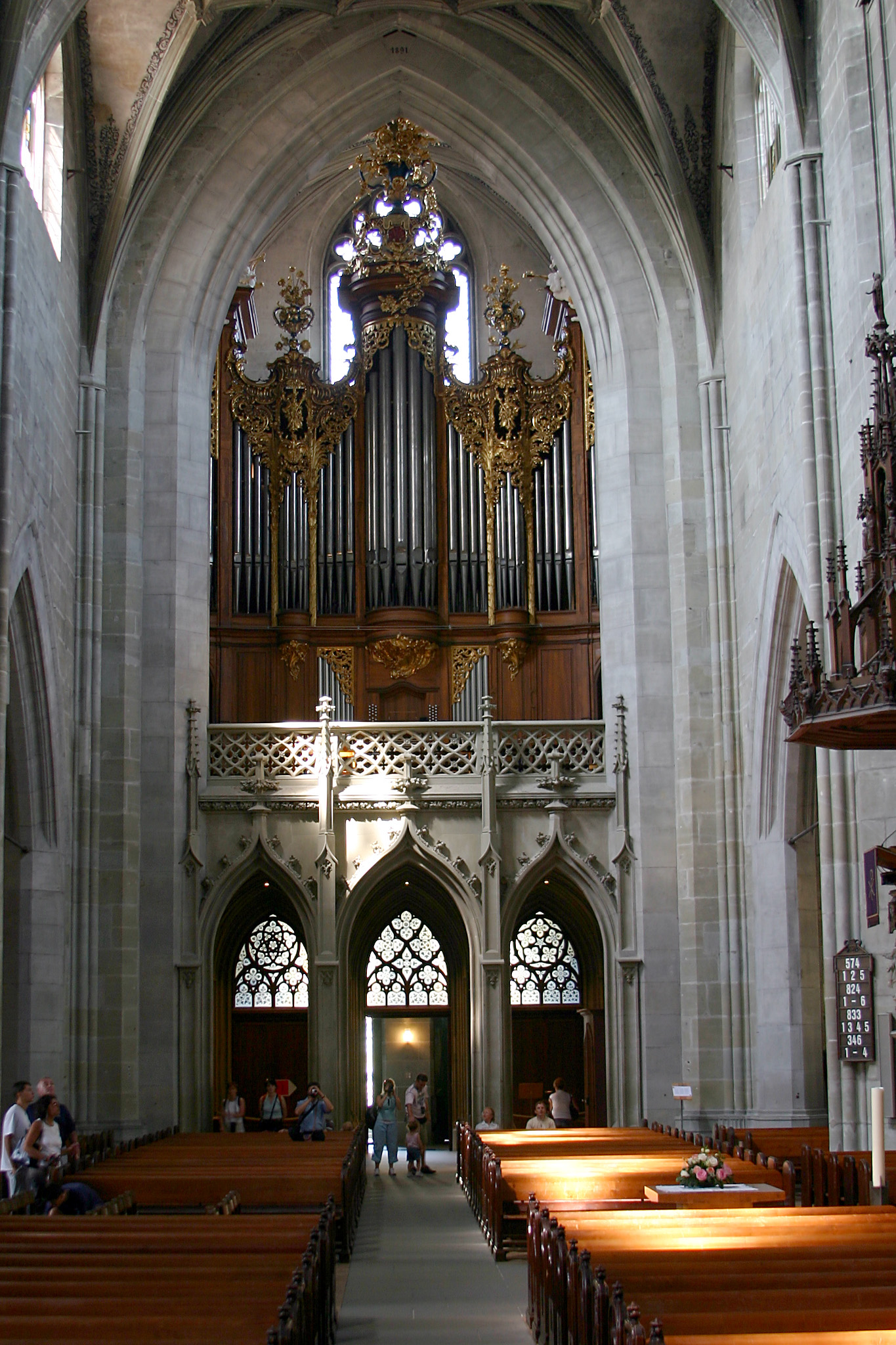
The cathedral organ sits above the main entrance

The first organ in the cathedral was built nearly 200 years after construction was completed. The first great organ was built in 1726–30. The town council voted to have the organ built on 5 June 1726. They hired Gottlieb Leuw from Bremgarten in September 1726. By January 1730 his work was nearly finished and the town began searching for an organist. While the main organ was finished in 1730, the ornamentation and finish work continued until 1736. This first organ had 38 organ stops, with a breast and back work as well as an echo work with pedals.

In 1746, the council decided that the organ needed to be rebuilt. On 16 September 1748, they reached an agreement with Victor Ferdinard Bossart to do so. On 1 June 1752, they signed a contract with Johann August Nahl to do the exterior decoration on the new organ. The rebuilt organ had 43 organ stops, and was built in a late-baroque style. It was renovated in 1827.

When the new organ balcony and screen were built in 1845–48 above the western entrance by Beat Rudolf von Sinner, the organ was completely rebuilt and was known as the second organ. The organ builder Friedrich Haas from Winterthur increased the number of stops to 55. The number of consoles was changed to three.

The third organ was built in 1903–04 by Friedrich Groll from Lucerne. While the exterior remained virtually untouched, the interior was rebuilt. Pneumatic tubes, slider chests and a mechanical action were added to the organ. However, the sound produced by this new organ was unpleasant. The interior of the organ was completely rebuilt in 1930.

The 1930 organ is the current one in the cathedral. It was restored in 1998–1999. The organ is currently used for a series of concerts throughout the year.

== Bell tower ==
The tower is open to the public, for a small fee. The lower viewing platform requires a climb up 254 steps and provides a view over Bern and perhaps as far as the Alps. The upper spire is also accessible by climbing an additional 90 steps from the lower platform.

=== Bells ===
The tower holds 7 ringing bells are distributed over two floors, 2 of which are bourdon bells. They are the second-lowest chime in Switzerland, after St. Gallen Cathedral. The largest bell or bourdon in the tower weighs 10.5 tons bell which was cast in 1611 and it is the largest bell in Switzerland. The bells in the tower are rung daily at noon and at 6 p.m. It is possible to stand near the bells when they are rung, but it is necessary to cover one's ears to prevent hearing damage. Only 6 of the 7 bells can be rung all at once, this is because Bells 4 and 5 share the same note.

In Switzerland, the bells are always numbered from largest to smallest, Bell 1 is always the tenor or bourdon.

No.	Name (German)	Name (English)	Casting year	Mass (KG)
1	Große Glocke/Susanne	Big Bell/Susanne (Bourdon)	1611	9940
2	Mittagsglocke	Midday Bell (2nd Bourdon)	1583	6395
3	Predigtglocke	Sermon Bell	1883	3322
4	Burgerglocke	Burger Bell	1403	3850
5	Armsünderglocke	Poor Sinner's Bell	1734	2300
6	Betglocke	Prayer Bell	1883	1428
7	Silberglocke	Silver Bell	1356	770

== Münsterplattform (Minster Terrace) ==
The Minster Terrace (in German: Münsterplattform) was built during 1334 and the mid 15th century as a large churchyard. During the Protestant Reformation the paintings and statues of the cathedral altars were dumped in the churchyard. Some of the art work has been found in archeological digs conducted on the terrace. During the 20th century, the terrace was changed from a graveyard to an open plaza. Lime and chestnut trees were planted and pathways were laid out, providing a pleasant park in the old city. The terrace towers over the Matte section of the old city and the Aare.

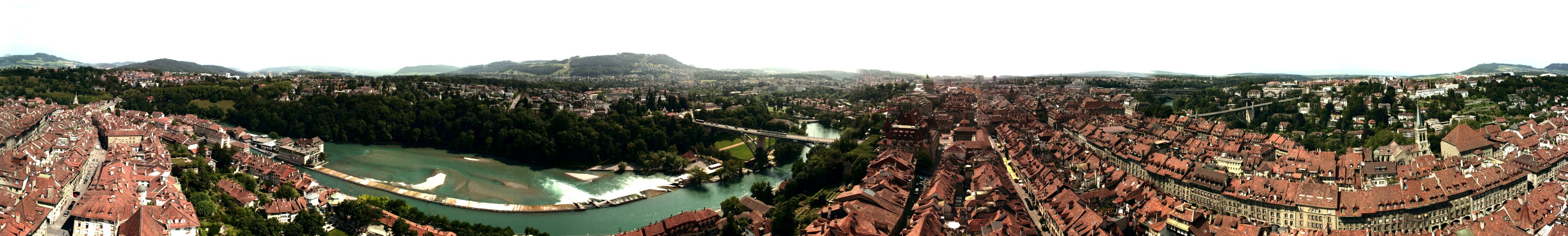
Panorama from the Minster

== See also ==
- Architecture of Switzerland
