= Bern Disputation =

1528 theological debate in Switzerland

The Bern Disputation was a debate over the theology of the Swiss Reformation that occurred in Bern from 6 to 26 January 1528 that ended in Bern becoming the second Swiss canton to officially become Protestant.

== Background ==
As the reformation in Zürich progressed in the 1520s, the surrounding Swiss cantons were also affected. Bern was the capital of the Swiss Confederacy and was "the largest, most conservative and aristocratic of the Swiss cantons" at the time. The early Protestant movement spearheaded by Martin Luther had an effect on Bern as early as 1518, and Protestant teaching was being debated in Bern by 1522. By 1523, Protestants already held significant posts in Bern, including artist Niklaus Manuel and preacher Berchtold Haller. Disputations with Luther and his followers had already occurred in different parts of Germany, and Switzerland had also already been home to the Zürich Disputations that saw Zürich officially become Protestant in January of 1524.

=== The Baden Disputation ===
The Swiss government called for an official disputation in 1526 in the Catholic town of Baden in Aargau. Many Protestants deemed it unsafe to attend, especially and notably the leading Swiss reformer Huldrych Zwingli. The two leading Protestant delegates to Baden were Johannes Oecolampadius, in the stead of Zwingli, and Bern's Berchtold Haller. The Disputation saw many more Roman Catholic representatives, who heavily outnumbered the Protestants, and the leading Roman Catholic disputant was Johannes Eck, who had famously debated Martin Luther in 1519. The disputation officially condemned all Protestant teachings as well as excommunicated Zwingli. Although the Baden Disputation was a decisive Roman Catholic victory, its incisive language drew many away from the Roman Catholic side, including the leaders of Bern. In addition, the Swiss government refused to let the leaders of Bern see the documentation of the proceedings of the disputation.

== The Bern Disputation ==
=== Development ===
In 1527, the Bern city elections installed a Protestant majority in the city council. The council promptly called for a disputation to take place on 6 January 1528. The Holy Roman Emperor Charles V called for it to be cancelled, but the letter arrived too late to take effect. The council invited clergy of all Swiss cantons, as well as delegations from the Swiss government and towns in southern Germany. The Bernese bishops were required by the council to attend, but did not actually attend, in defiance of the council. The council invited both Roman Catholics and Protestants, but most of the Roman Catholic delegates refused to come. Johannes Eck, the chief Roman Catholic in the Baden Disputation, refused "to follow the heretics into their nooks and corners." The leading Protestant representatives included Huldrych Zwingli, Heinrich Bullinger, Johannes Oecolampadius, Martin Bucer, and Wolfgang Capito. In total, there were around 350 attendees, around 200 of them being from Bernese territory.

=== The Ten Theses ===
The disputation was to debate the following ten theses:

1. The holy Christian Church, whose only Head is Christ, is born of the Word of God, and abides in the same, and listens not to the voice of a stranger.

2. The Church of Christ makes no laws and commandments without the Word of God. Hence human traditions are no more binding on us than as far as they are founded in the Word of God.

3. Christ is the only wisdom, righteousness, redemption, and satisfaction for the sins of the whole world. Hence it is a denial of Christ when we confess another ground of salvation and satisfaction.

4. The essential and corporal presence of the body and blood of Christ cannot be demonstrated from the Holy Scripture.

5. The mass as now in use, in which Christ is offered to God the Father for the sins of the living and the dead, is contrary to the Scripture, a blasphemy against the most holy sacrifice, passion, and death of Christ, and on account of its abuses an abomination before God.

6. As Christ alone died for us, so he is also to be adored as the only Mediator and Advocate between God the Father and the believers. Therefore it is contrary to the Word of God to propose and invoke other mediators.

7. Scripture knows nothing of a purgatory after this life. Hence all masses and other offices for the dead are useless.

8. The worship of images is contrary to Scripture. Therefore images should be abolished when they are set up as objects of adoration.

9. Matrimony is not forbidden in the Scripture to any class of men; but fornication and unchastity are forbidden to all.

10. Since, according to the Scripture, an open fornicator must be excommunicated, it follows that unchastity and impure celibacy are more pernicious to the clergy than to any other class.

All to the glory of God and his holy Word.

These theses were drafted by Berthold Haller and Franz Kolb, and were sent to Zwingli who suggested revisions that were made to it. Haller was a close friend of Zwingli, and the theses clearly embody the influence of Zwingli, as well as the negative influence of the Baden Disputation in 1526.

=== Decision ===
Due to most of the Roman Catholics not attending, the Protestants heavily outnumbered the Roman Catholics this time, and reversed all the decisions of the Baden Disputation. The council also approved the 10 theses, and most of the clergy in Bern subscribed to them. It led to an immediate abolition of the Mass as well as a wave of iconoclasm.

== Aftermath ==
These ten theses were approved by the Bern city council on 7 February 1528. The council also approved 13 additional articles drafted by Zwingli that furthered ecclesiastical reforms that abolished the priesthood and installed a new liturgy. Bern would host another three major disputations in the 1530s, furthering the reformation in Switzerland, and distinguishing itself from the Lutheran Reformation in Germany.
