= Niklaus Manuel Deutsch =

Swiss artist, writer, mercenary and Reformed politician

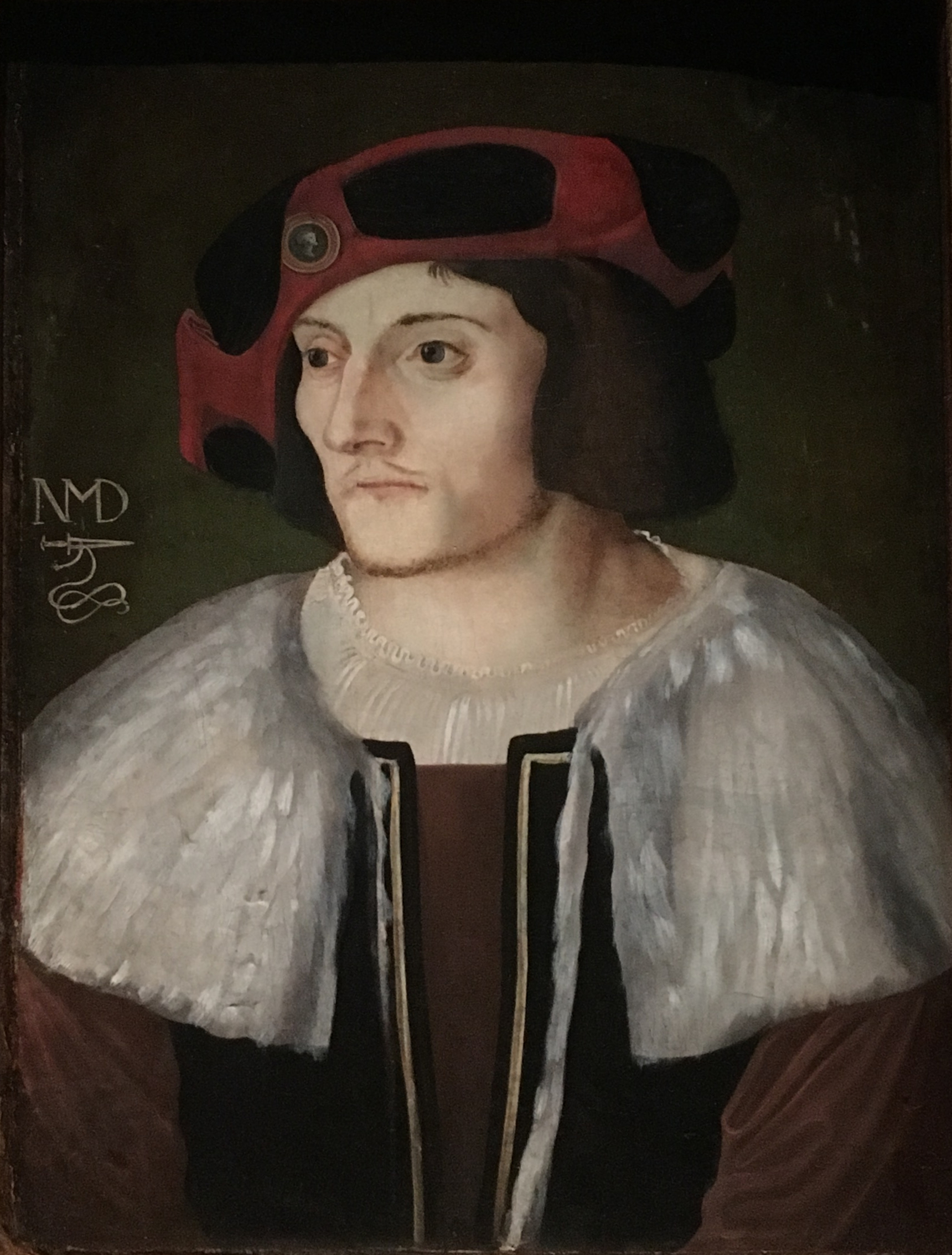
Self-portrait of Niklaus Manuel, c. 1515

Niklaus Manuel Deutsch (Niklaus Manuel, c. 1484 – 28 April 1530), of Bern, was a Swiss artist, writer, mercenary and Reformed politician.

== Biography ==
Niklaus was most likely the son of Emanuel Aleman (or Alleman), a pharmacist whose own father had immigrated from Chieri in Piedmont, and his wife Margaretha Fricker (or Frikart), an illegitimate daughter of Bernese city scribe Thüring Fricker. He used "Manuel", the given name of his father, as his surname and used "Deutsch", as the German equivalent of the surname Alleman, as an additional appellation, signing his works with the initials NMD.

He is first recorded in 1509, when he married Katharina Frisching, daughter of Hans Frisching, a former Bernese reeve and member of the city council (Kleiner Rat). Niklaus Manuel and Katharina Frisching had six children. Two of them, Hans Rudolf Manuel Deutsch (1525–1571) and Niklaus Manuel Deutsch the Younger (1528–1588), were also artists. Niklaus Manuel is considered the founder of the patrician Manuel family of Berne. From 1510, Niklaus Manuel was a member of the city parliament (Grosser Rat). He is first recorded as a painter in the employment of the city in 1513. Aside from Holbein he is the major representative of Renaissance painting in Switzerland.

In 1514, he bought the house at Gerechtigkeitsgasse 72 which remained in possession of the Manuel family until the 17th century. In 1516, he entered mercenary service as the secretary of Albrecht von Stein, participating in the French campaign in the War of the League of Cambrai. His famous danse macabre on the wall of the Dominican Abbey in Berne was begun in 1516 or 1517; this work was destroyed in 1660, but a 1649 copy by Albrecht Kauw is extant. Niklaus Manuel's latest signed works date from around 1520, after which time he dedicated himself to literary production. He used a drawing of a Swiss degen alongside the initials NMD as his mark; the Swiss degen also appears on his literary manuscripts, and schwitzerdegen appears as his author's pseudonym in some of his printed works.

In 1522 he once again entered service with Albrecht von Stein in a campaign in Lombardy, and was wounded at Novara. He also participated in the Battle of Bicocca of 27 April. He composed a satirical song against the German Landsknechts who defeated the Swiss mercenaries in this battle.

After the 1522 campaign, he was also harshly critical of the Holy See, specifically the late Pope Leo X and his militaristic policy in the Italian Wars. In the years that followed, he was a strong supporter of the Swiss Reformation and a friend of Huldrych Zwingli, who like him had been on campaign in Italy and had become disenchanted with the warmongering of the pope in the Italian Wars. He campaigned for the reformed cause in Bern with Berchtold Haller, the priest at St Vincent Münster. He wrote two anti-catholic (anti-papist) carnival plays or Fasnachtsspiele, performed in 1522. The plays were very popular and are said to have done more for the adoption of the Reformation in Berne than the sermons of Haller. The two plays were printed as early as 1524, and again in 1540. The 1540 edition was the basis of a re-edition published in 1836.

In 1523, he was given the office of Bernese reeve of Erlach, Echallens and Nidau. He was sent as a representative of Bern to the Swiss Diet in 1526. He served as a member in the city council (Kleiner Rat) from April 1528 until his death.

== Artistic works ==
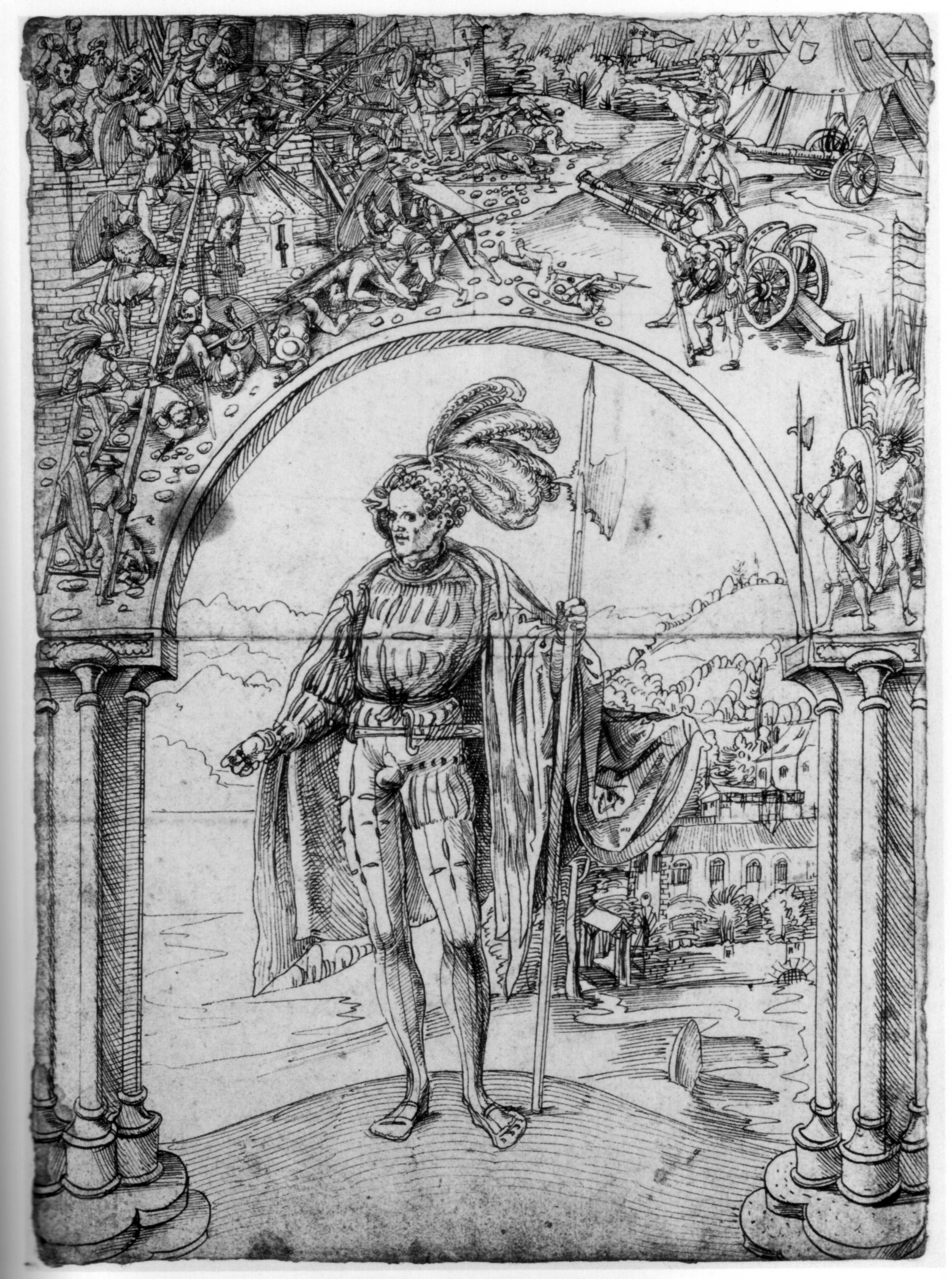
Swiss mercenary, with a scene of the assault on Castellazzo (1513/4)

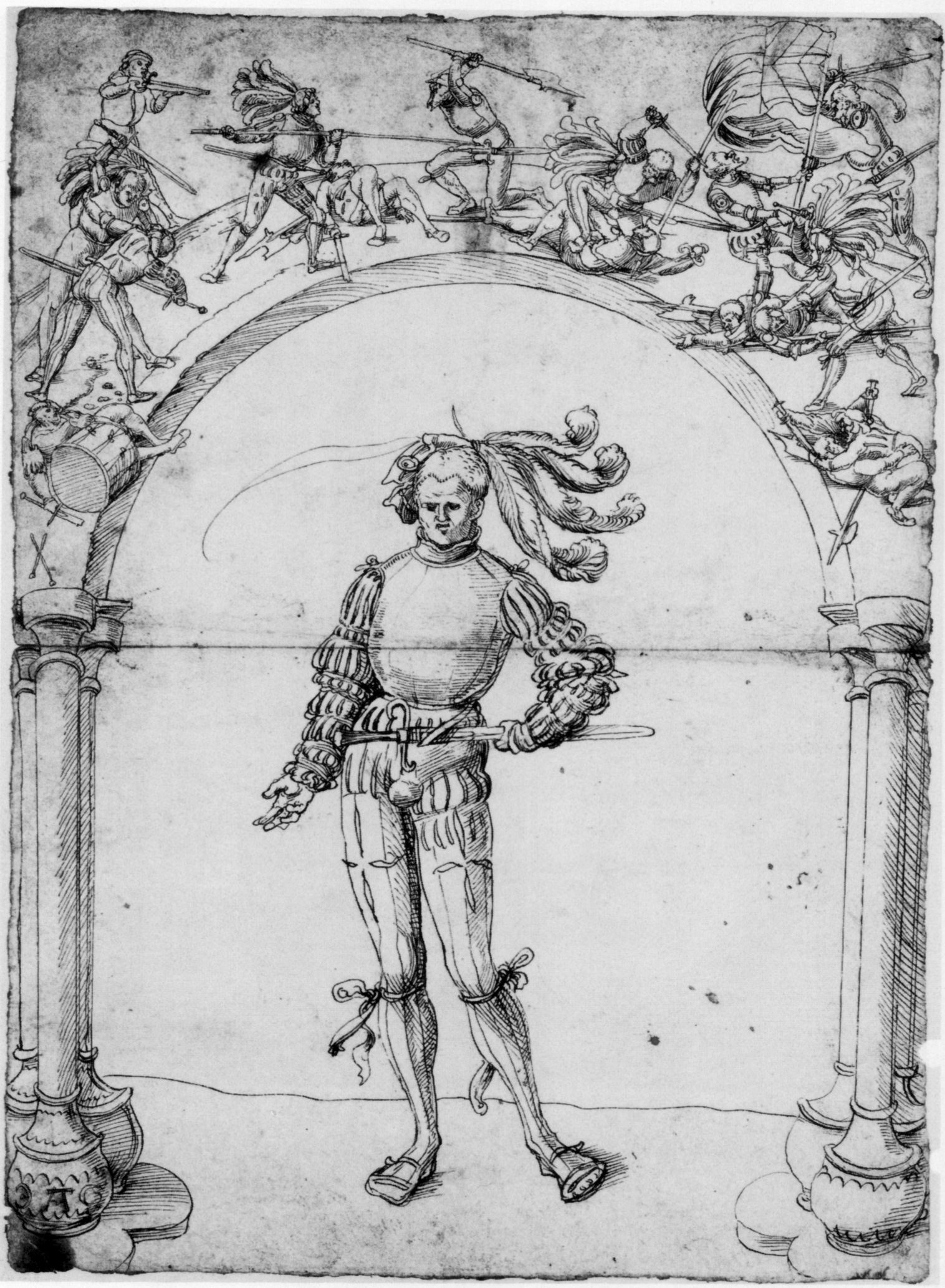
Swiss mercenary (1513/4)

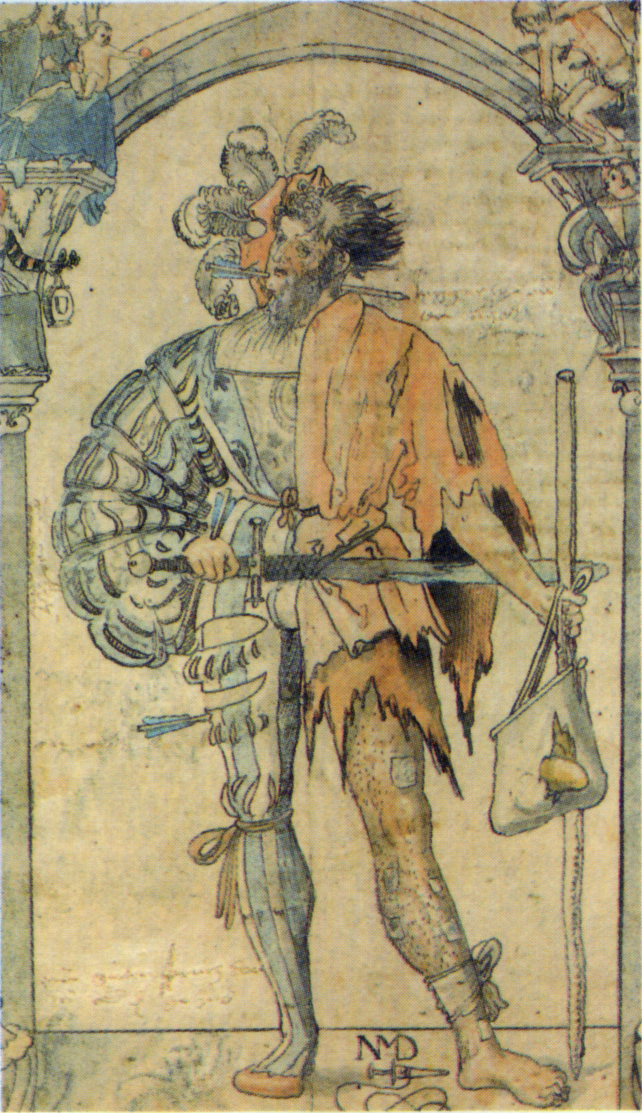
Allegory on mercenary service

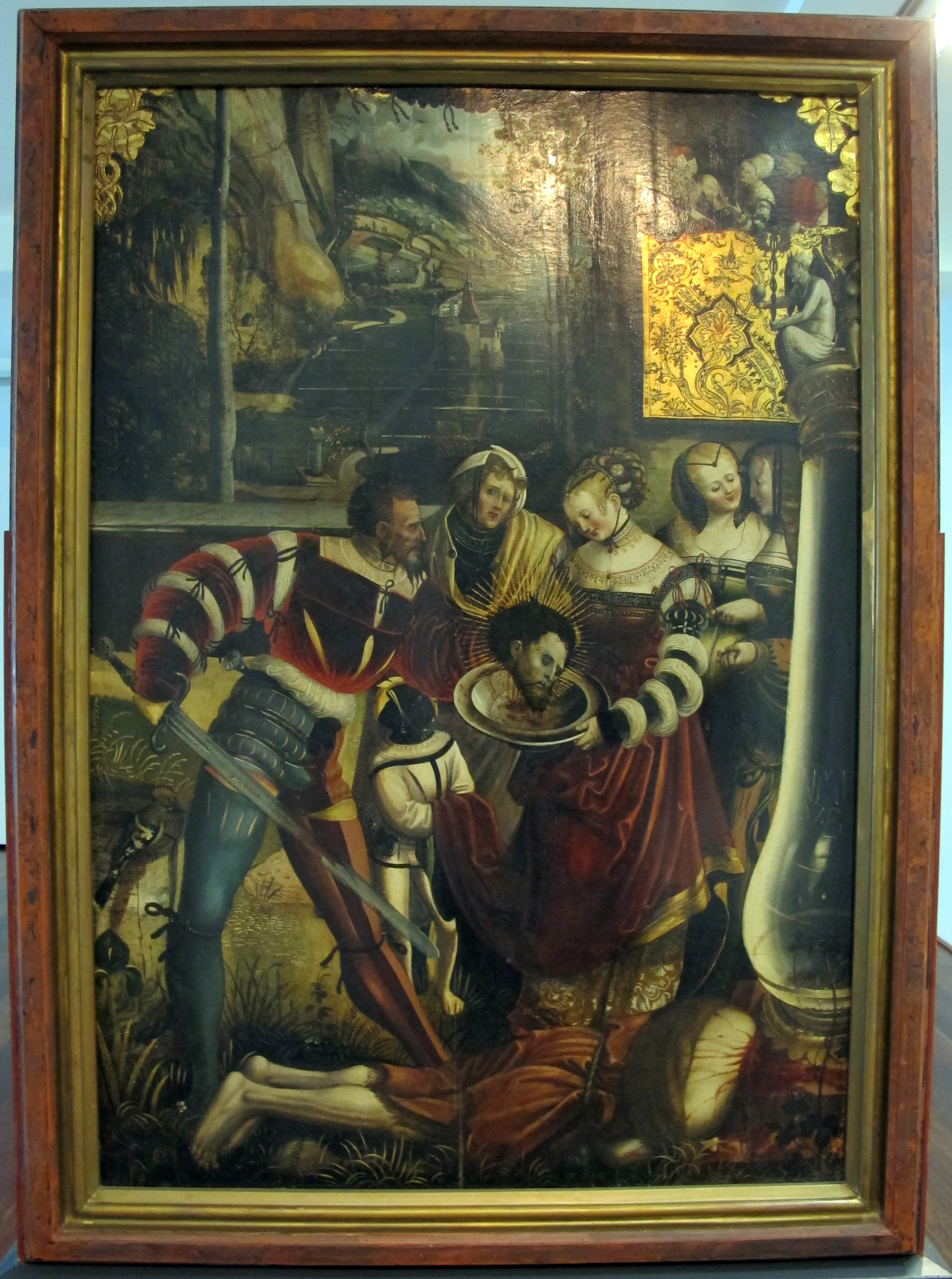
Beheading of John the Baptist (1513/4)

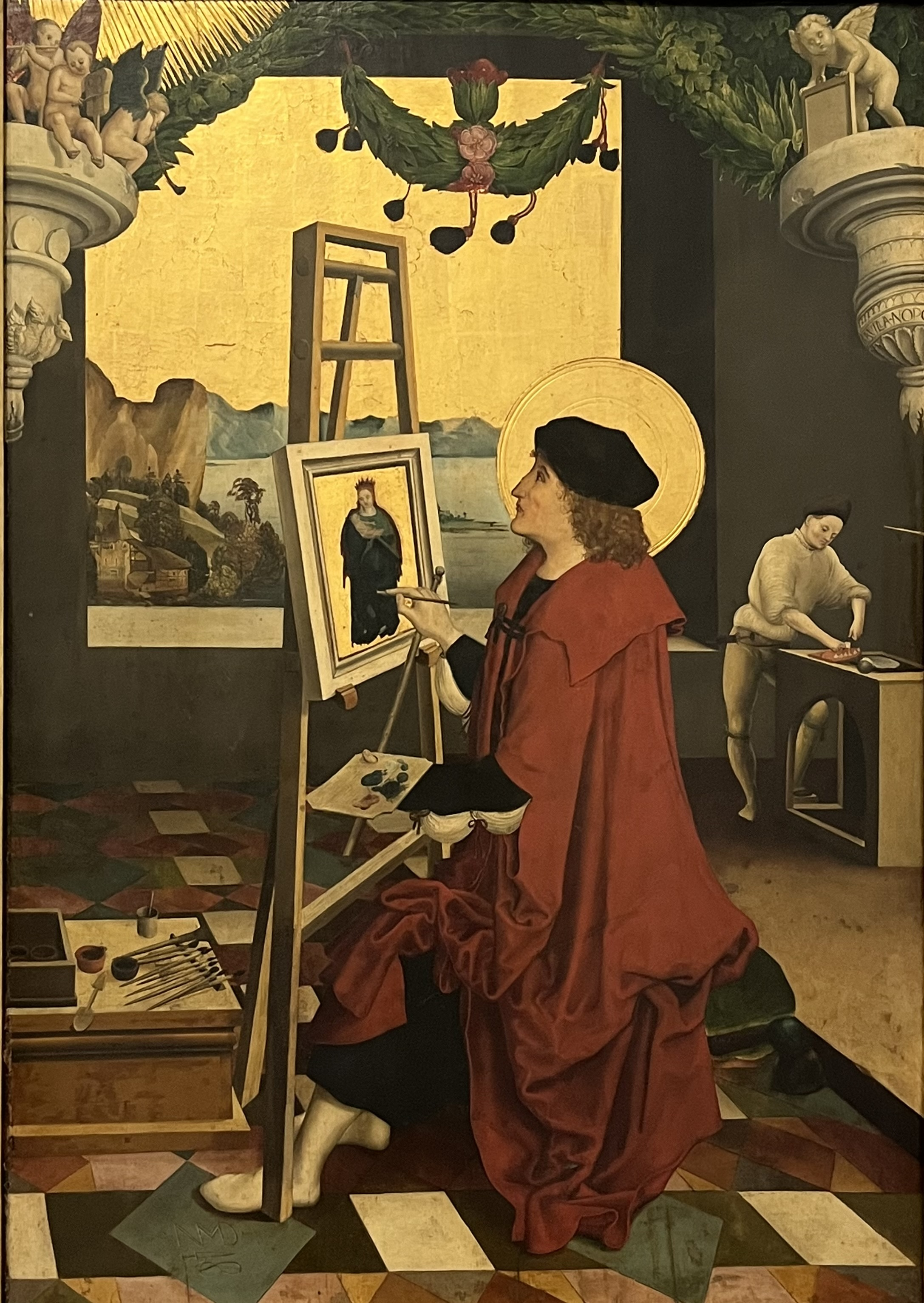
Saint Luke painting the Virgin

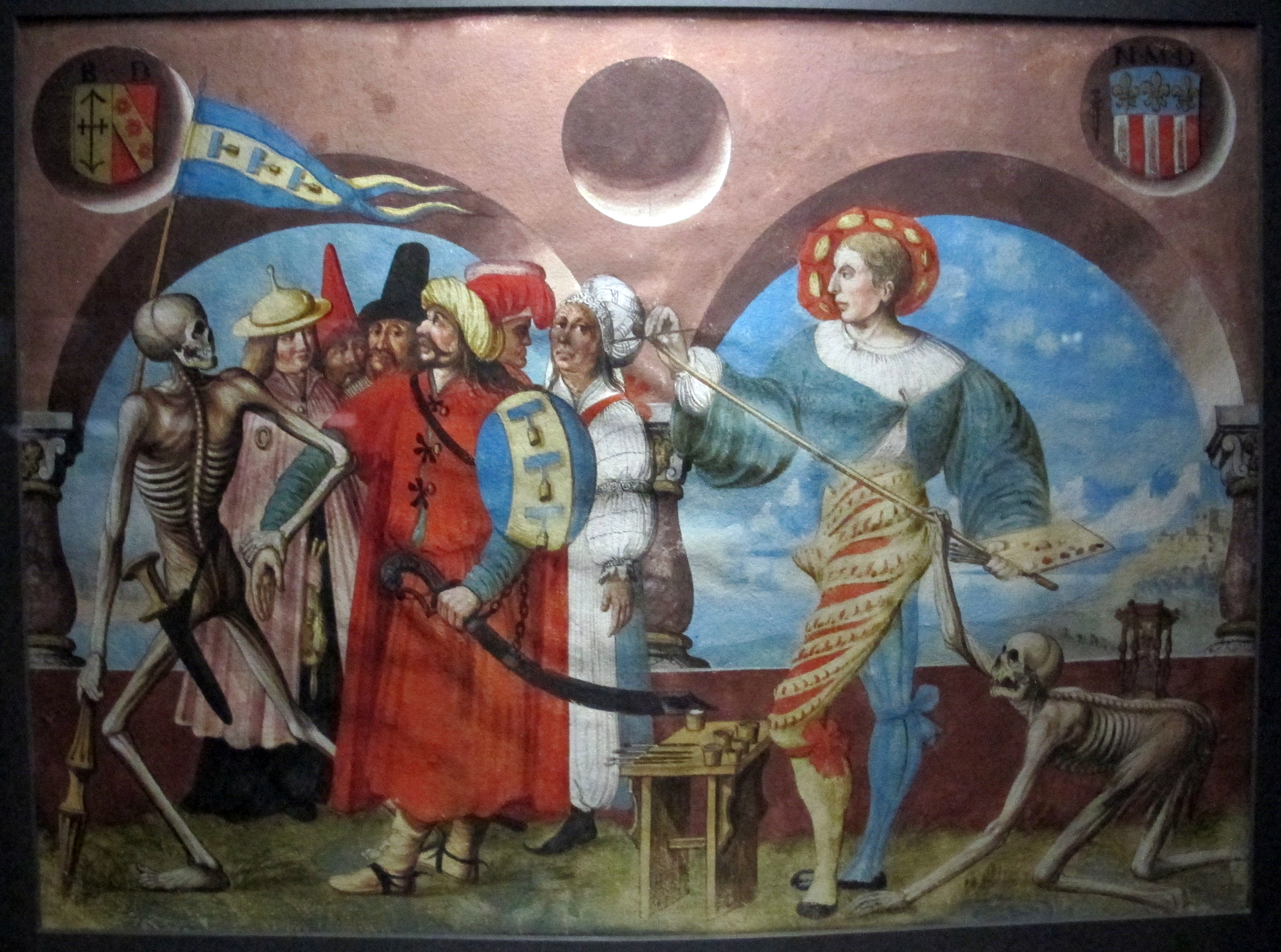
1649 copy of Niklaus Manuel's self-portrait in the lost dance macabre of the Dominican cemetery in Bern (1516/7)

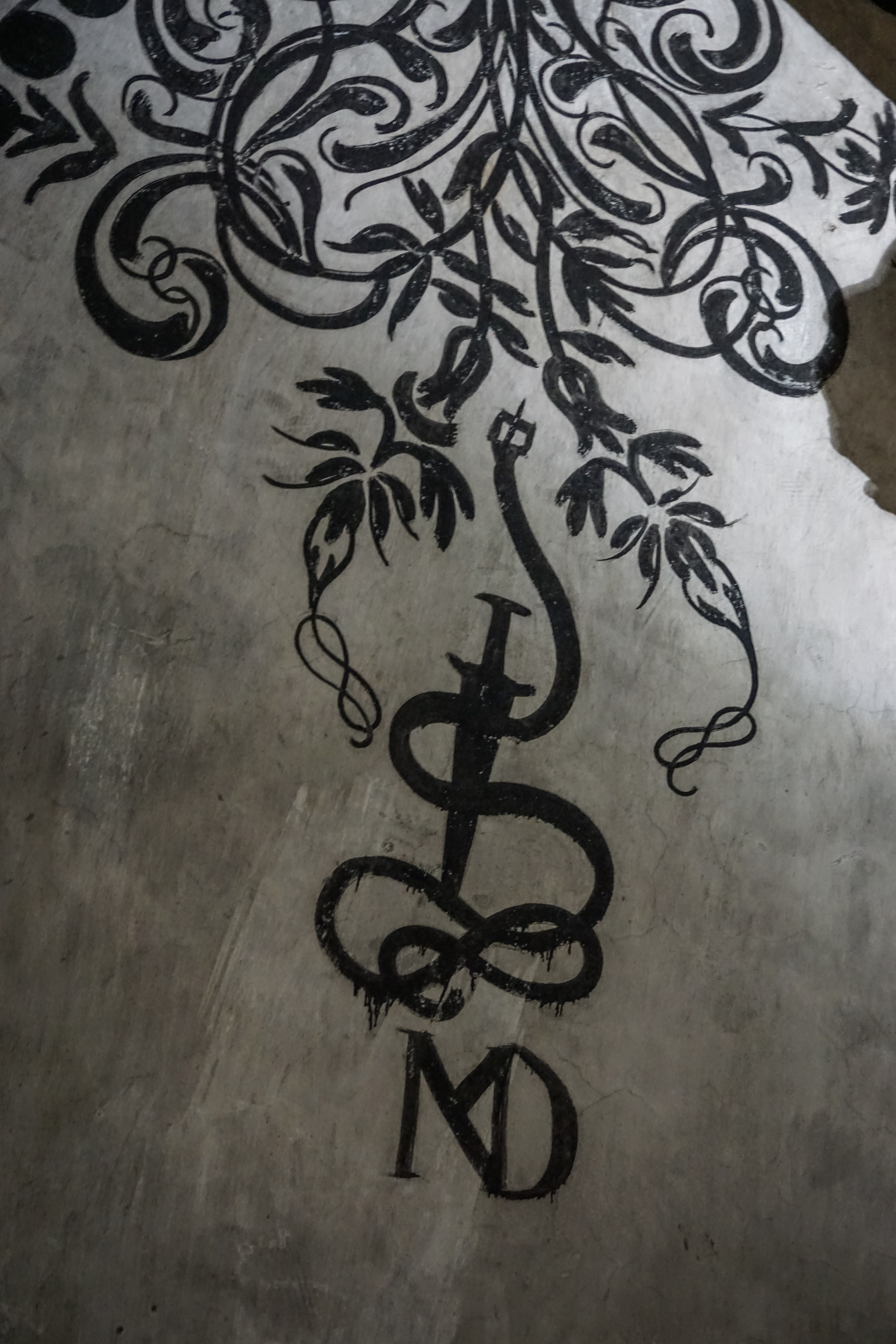
The NMD initials with Swiss degen, signature of his ornamental painting of ceiling of the choir in Bern Minster (1516/7)

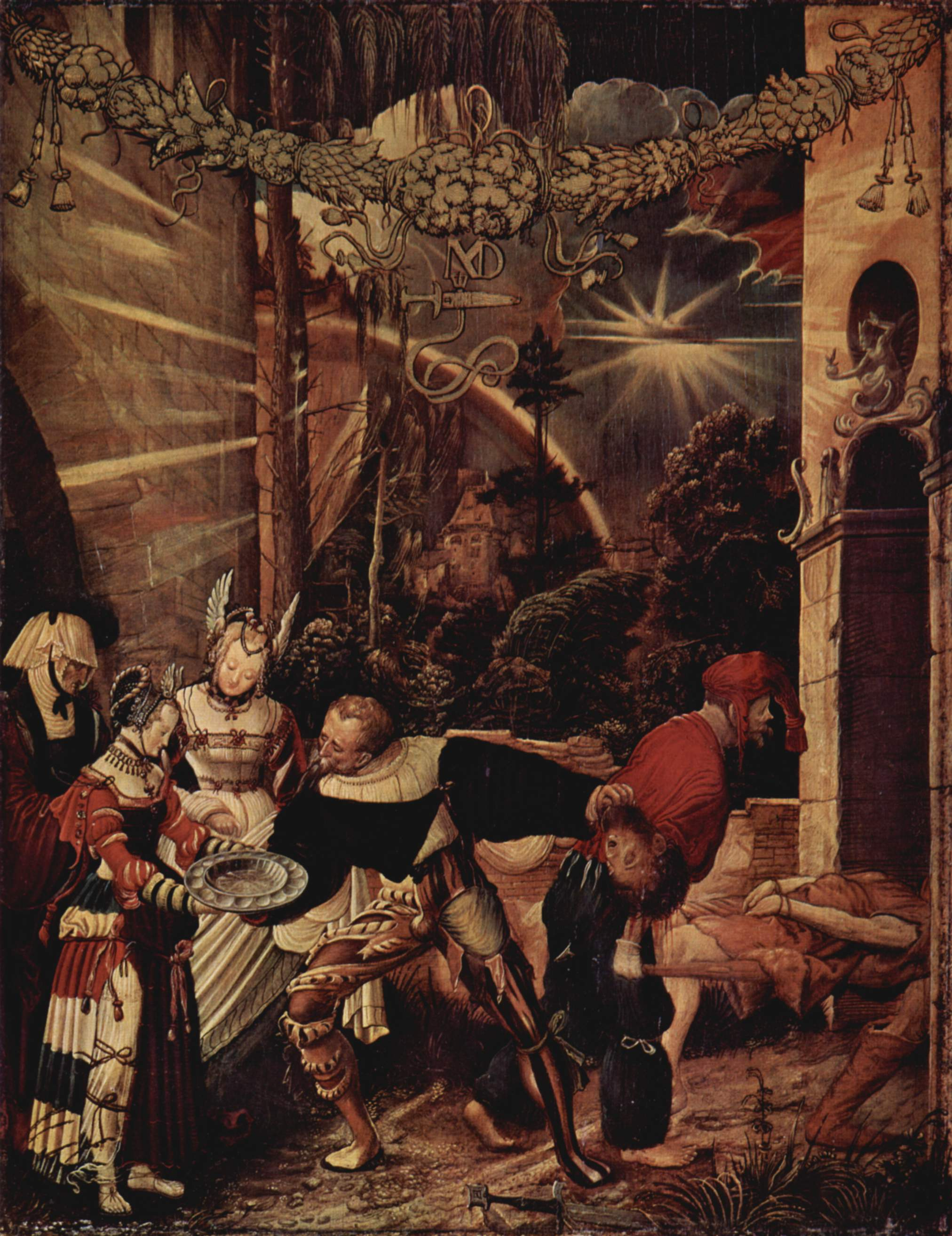
Beheading of John the Baptist (1517)

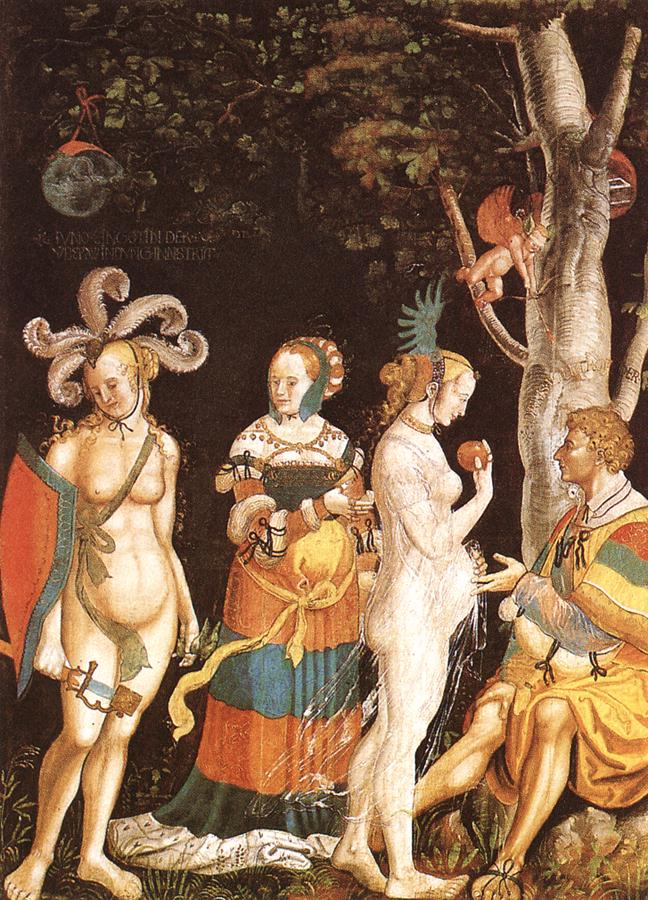
The Judgement of Paris (1517/8)

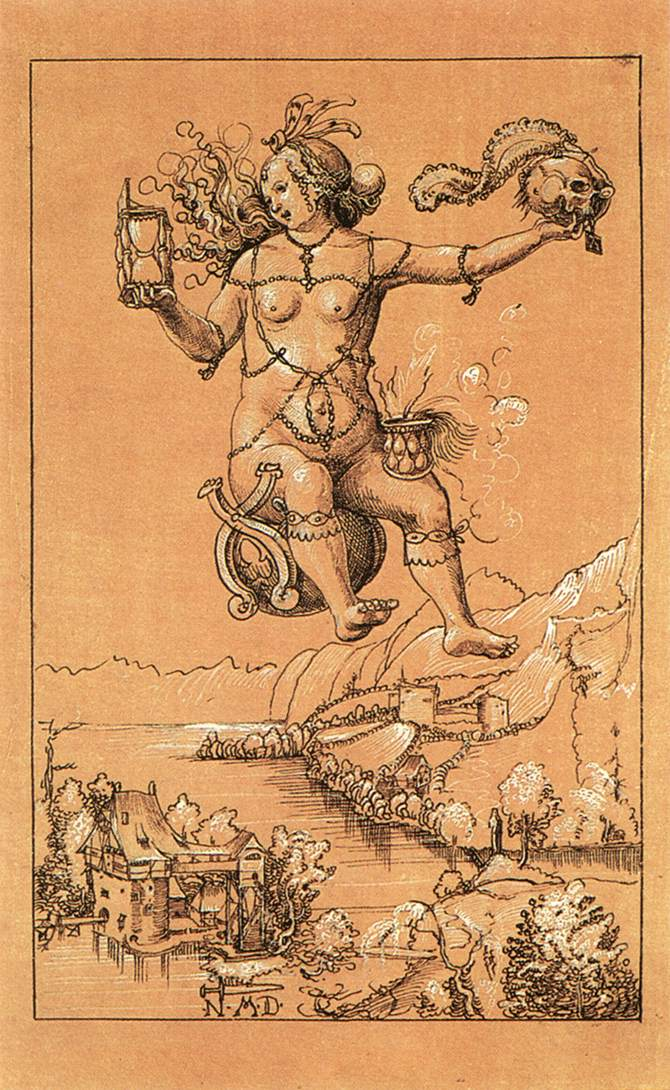
Allegory of Death (drawing)

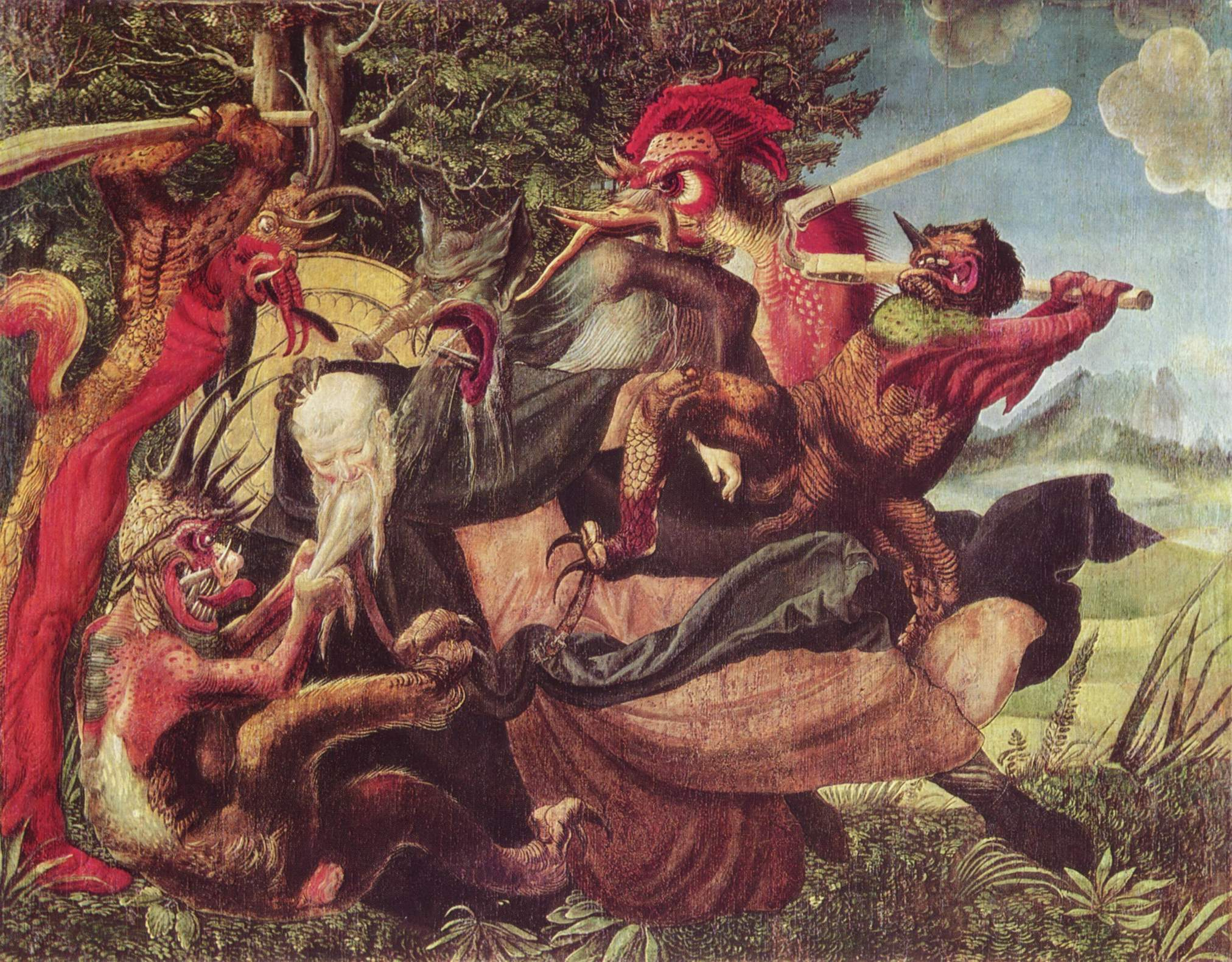
Demons Tormenting Antonius (1520)

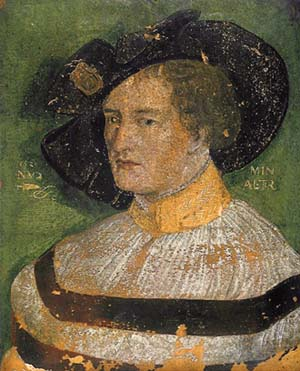
Self portrait (1520)

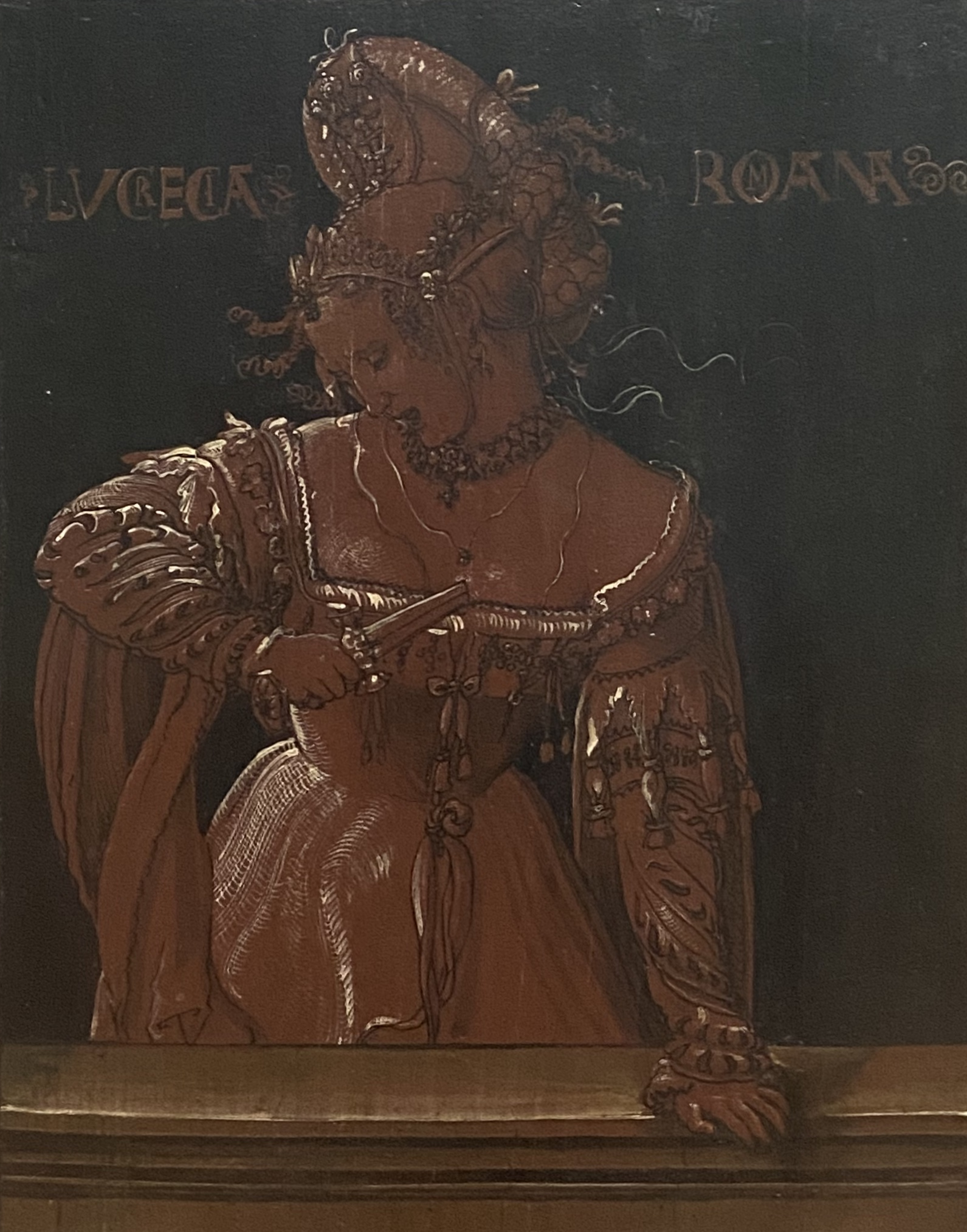
Lucretia (1517)

== Literary works ==
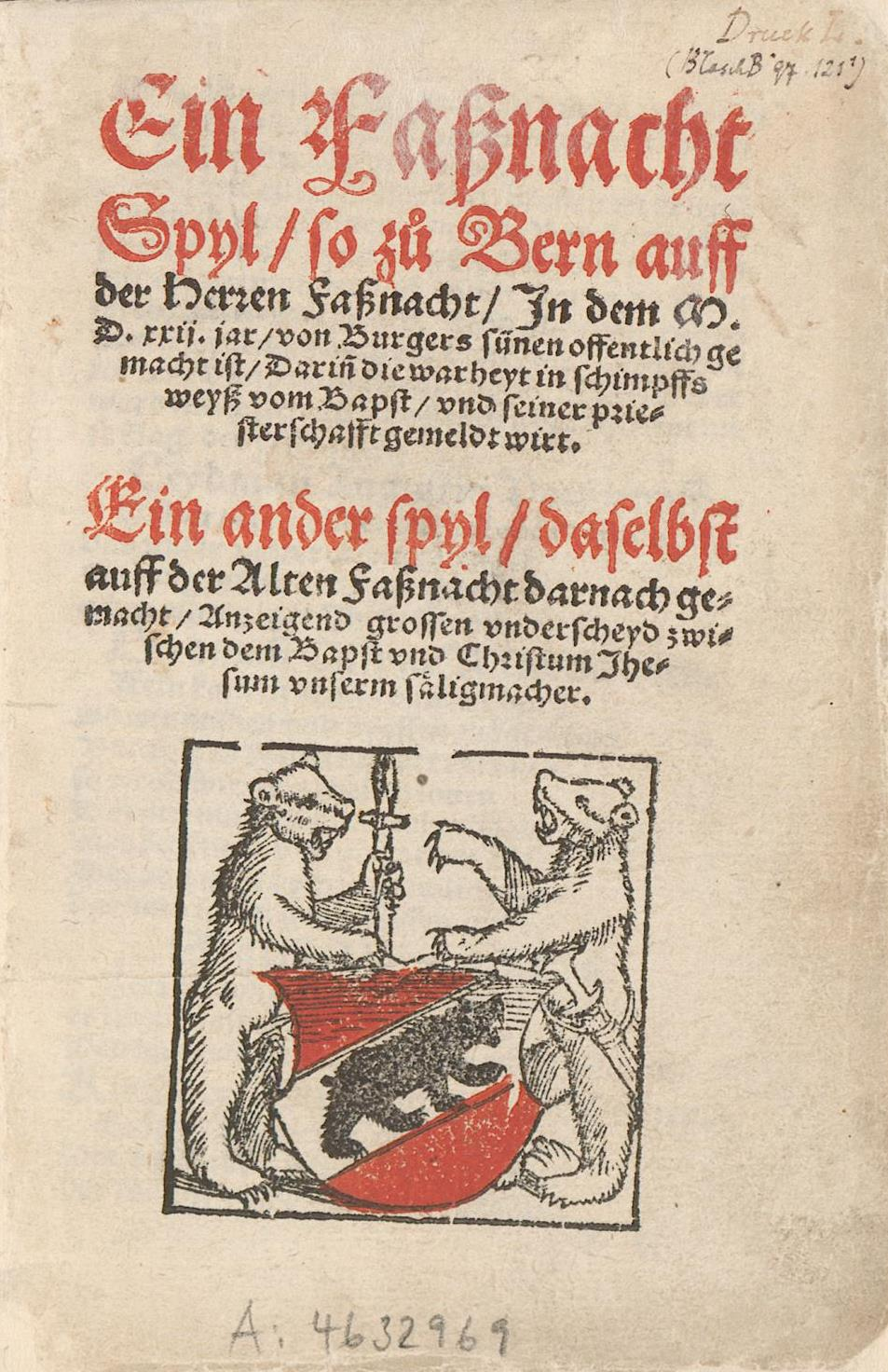
Cover of an early print of the plays vom Babst und seiner priesterschafft and Underscheyd zwischen dem Bapst und Christum Jhesum

- ?1510, with Thomas Murner, Ein schon bewerts lied von der reynen unbefleckten entpfengnüß Marie ("Song of the Immaculate Conception")
- 1522, Ein Traum (poem, on the disastrous involvement of the Holy See (the recently deceased "warrior pope" Leo X) in the Italian Wars)
- 1522?, Nüw lied vnd verantwortung deß Sturms halb beschähn zu Pigogga ("New song and account of the attack at Biccoca", printed after 1525)
- 1522, Underscheyd zwischen dem Bapst und Christum Jhesum (drama, "Difference between the Pope and Jesus Christ")
- 1522/3, vom Babst und seiner priesterschafft (drama, "on the Pope and his priesthood")
- 1523, Die Totenfresser ("Eaters of the Dead")
- 1525, Der Ablaßkrämer (drama, "The seller of indulgences")
- 1526, Das Barbeli (dramatic dialogue, against monastery life)
- 1526, Fabers und Eggen Badenfahrt (dialogue, "Faber and Eck at the Conference of Baden")
- 1528, Krankheit und Testament der Messe (satire, "Sickness and testament of the holy mass")

The play Elsli Tragdenknaben (von dem Elszlin trag den knaben und von Uly Rechenzan, mit irem eelichen Gerichtshandel), printed in 1530, has been ascribed to Niklaus Manuel, but the attribution is probably spurious.
