= Postgasse =

Street in Bern, Switzerland

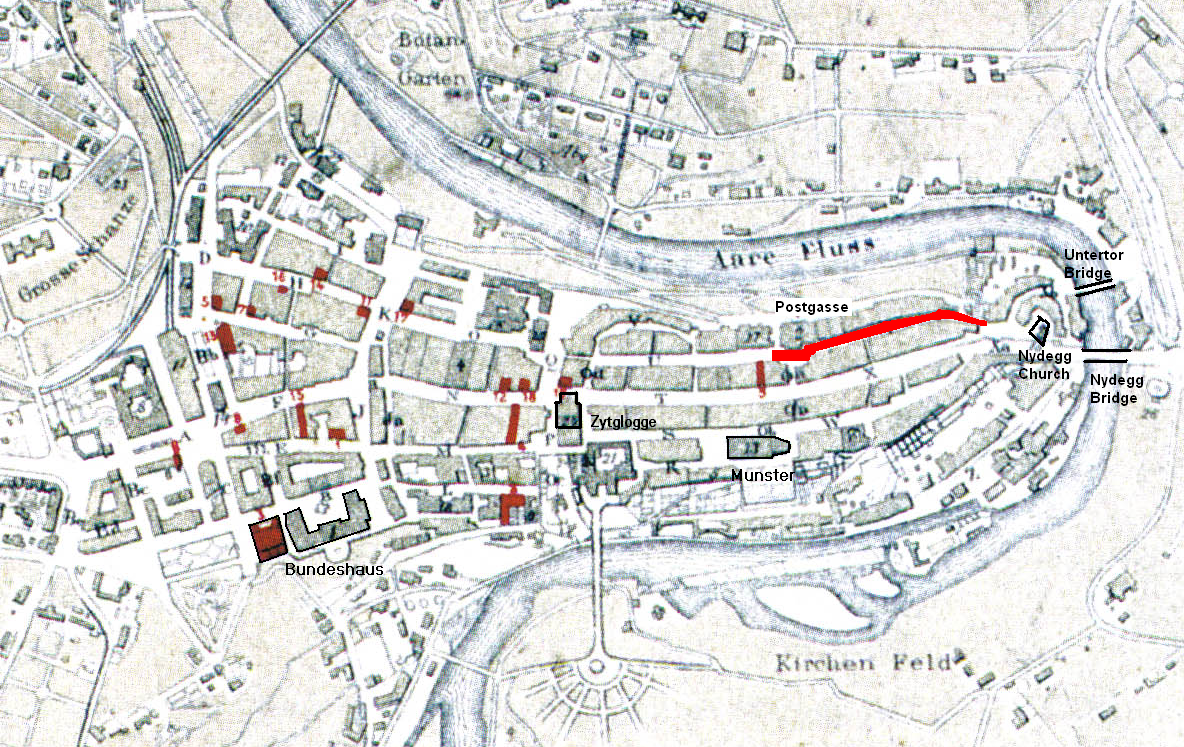
- Old City of Bern with Postgasse highlighted
- Length: 300 m (980 ft)
- Location: Old City of Bern, Bern, Switzerland
- Postal code: 3011
- Coordinates: 46°56′56.46″N 7°27′19.76″E

The Postgasse (Swiss Standard German pronunciation: [ˈpɔstˌɡasɛ]) is one of the streets in the Old City of Bern, the medieval city center of Bern, Switzerland. It is part of the Zähringerstadt which was built during the foundation of the city in 1191. It runs from Nydeggstalden near the Aare river in the east to the transverse Kreuzgasse, where the name changes to Rathausgasse. It is part of the UNESCO Cultural World Heritage Site that encompasses the Old City.

== History ==
Starting in 1300, the street that would become Rathausgasse and Postgasse was known as Hormansgasse or Hormatsgasse. The Horman family, the origin of the name, lived in Bern from 1224-1326. Since 1619 the upper section (now Rathausgasse) was known as Metzgergasse (Butcher's Lane), while the lower section was first called Postgasse in 1798. In 1675, in the house at Nr. 64/66, the Fischer'sche Post was first built which was the origin of the name in the following century. However, while the name was official in 1798, it wasn't until about 1870 that it became common. In the meantime, the Post moved from Postgasse in 1832.

== Sights ==
The Fischer‘sche Posthäuser at Postgasse 64/66 is listed as a Swiss heritage site of national significance.

The Antonierkirche, a hospital-church of the Hospital Brothers of St. Anthony was started in 1494 on the site of a chapel from 1444. The church was finished in 1505.
