= Rathausgasse =

Street in Bern, Switzerland

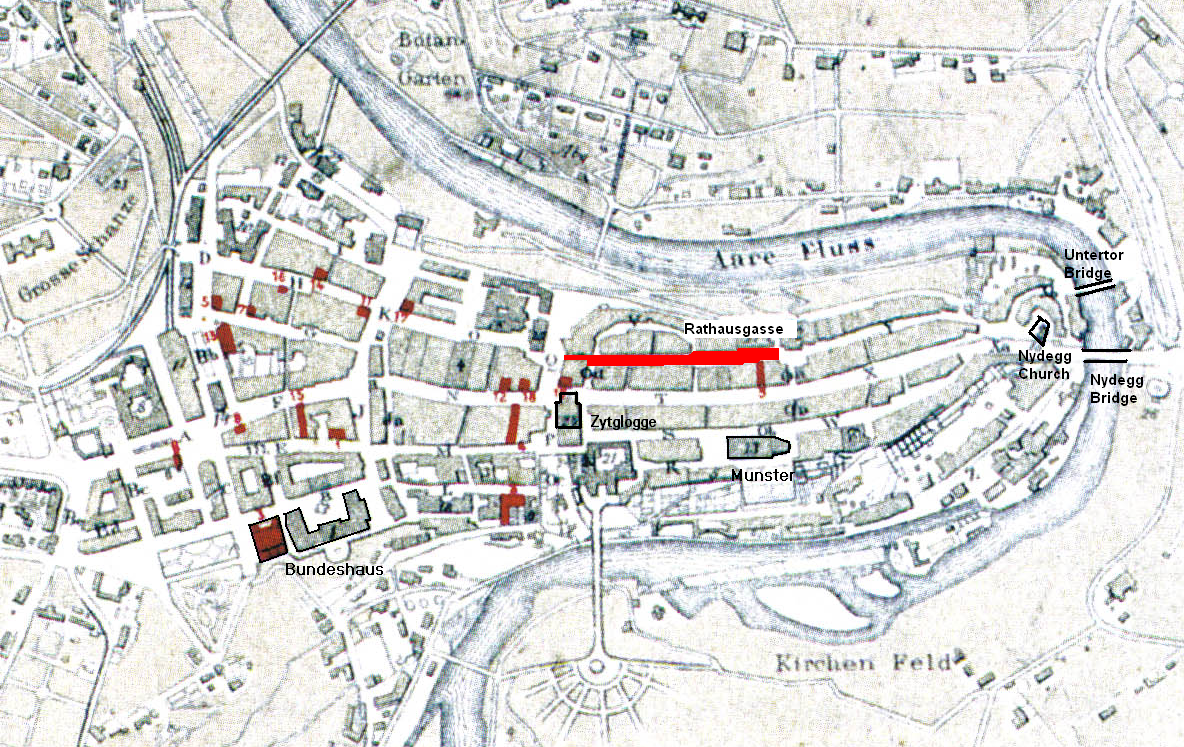
- Old City of Bern with Rathausgasse highlighted
- Length: 300 m (980 ft)
- Location: Old City of Bern, Bern, Switzerland
- Postal code: 3011
- Coordinates: 46°56′54.52″N 7°26′59.85″E

The Rathausgasse is one of the streets in the Old City of Bern, the medieval city center of Bern, Switzerland. It is part of the Zähringerstadt which was built during the foundation of the city in 1191. It runs from the transverse Kreuzgasse, where the name changes to Postgasse to Kornhausplatz. It is part of the UNESCO Cultural World Heritage Site that encompasses the Old City.

== History ==
Starting in 1300, the street that would become Rathausgasse and Postgasse was known as Hormansgasse or Hormatsgasse. The Horman family, the origin of the name, lived in Bern from 1224 to 1326. Since 1619 the upper section (now Rathausgasse) was known as Metzgergasse (Butcher's Lane), while the lower section was first called Postgasse in 1798. From 1880 until 1975 Rathausgasse was the name of just the northern section of Kreuzgasse. The upper section of what would become Rathausgasse 82 and 84 were known before the 19th century as Nägeligässli and in the 19th century as Statthaltergässli. Since 1898 those two houses became part of the Metzgergasse. Then, on 1 November 1971, Metzgergasse was renamed to Rathausgasse.
