= Nydeggstalden =

Street in Bern, Switzerland

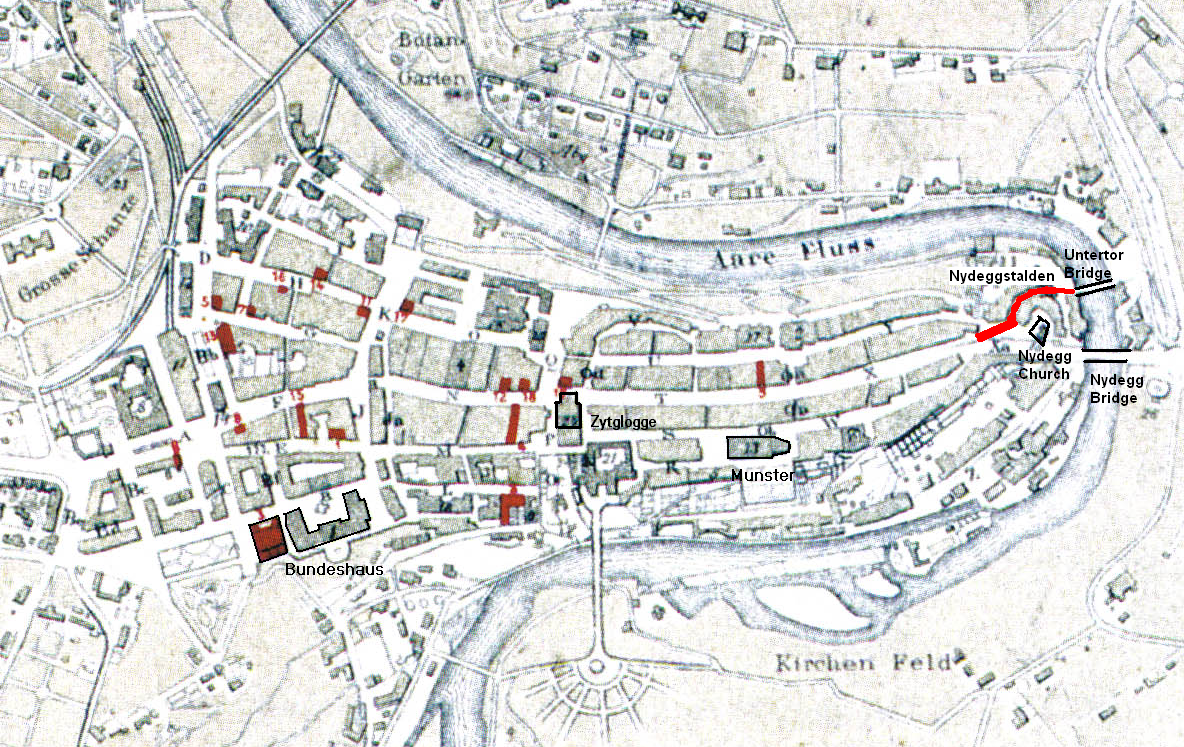
- Old City of Bern with Nydeggstalden highlighted
- Length: 100 m (330 ft)
- Location: Old City of Bern, Bern, Switzerland
- Postal code: 3011
- Coordinates: 46°56′57.6″N 7°27′27.45″E

The Nydeggstalden is one of the streets in the Old City of Bern, the medieval city center of Bern, Switzerland. It is part of the Nydegg which was part of the medieval industrial section of Bern. It is a semi-circular road running from Gerechtigkeitsgasse toward the Aare river and the Untertorbrücke (German: Lower Gate bridge). It is part of the UNESCO Cultural World Heritage Site that encompasses the Old City.

== History ==
Originally Nydeggstalden was the eastern route from the Aare to Gerechtigkeitsgasse. In 1759 the road was smoothed and repaired. In 1956/58 the Schattseitigen (Shadow or southern side) of the street was rebuilt under the direction of H. Weiss.
