= Spitalgasse =

Street in the Old City of Bern

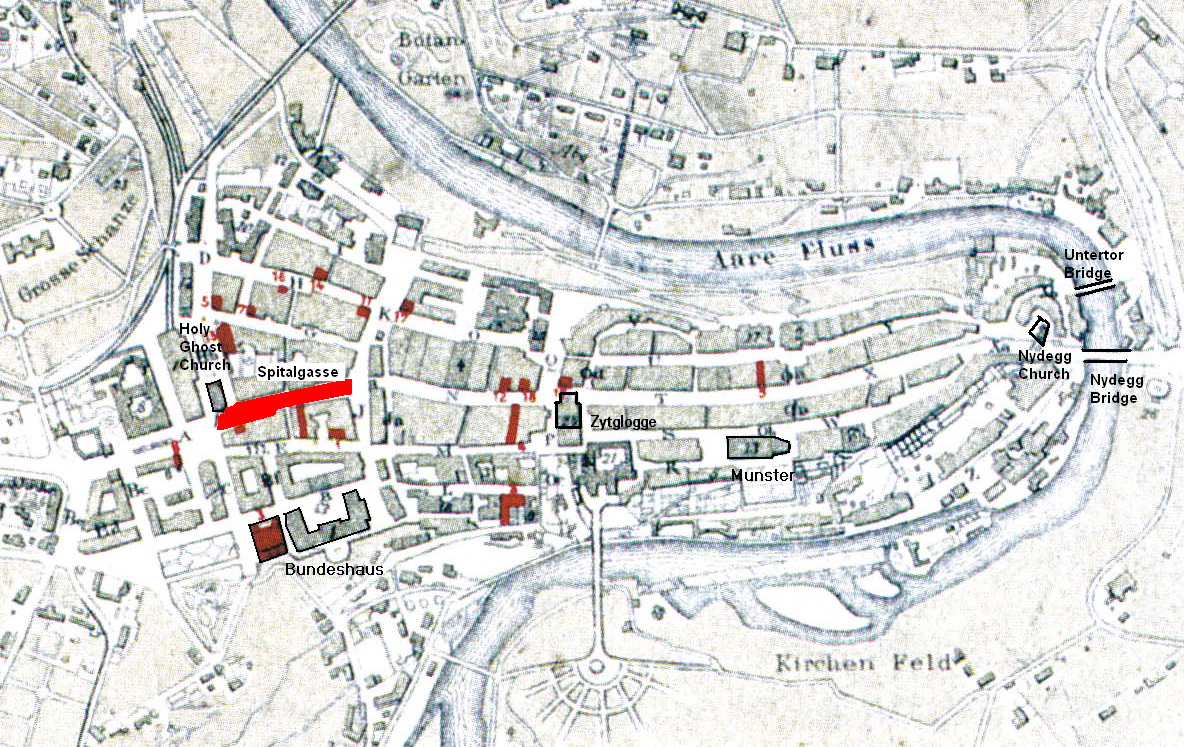
- Old City of Bern with Spitalgasse highlighted
- Length: 200 m (660 ft)
- Location: Old City of Bern, Switzerland
- Postal code: 3011
- Coordinates: 46°56′52.74″N 7°26′32.45″E

The Spitalgasse is one of the streets in the Old City of Bern, the medieval city center of Bern, Switzerland. It is part of the Äussere Neustadt which was built during the third expansion from 1344 to 1346. The eastern end is at Waisenhausplatz and Bärenplatz while the western end is at Bahnhofplatz near the Church of the Holy Ghost. It is part of the UNESCO Cultural World Heritage Site that encompasses the Old City.

== History ==
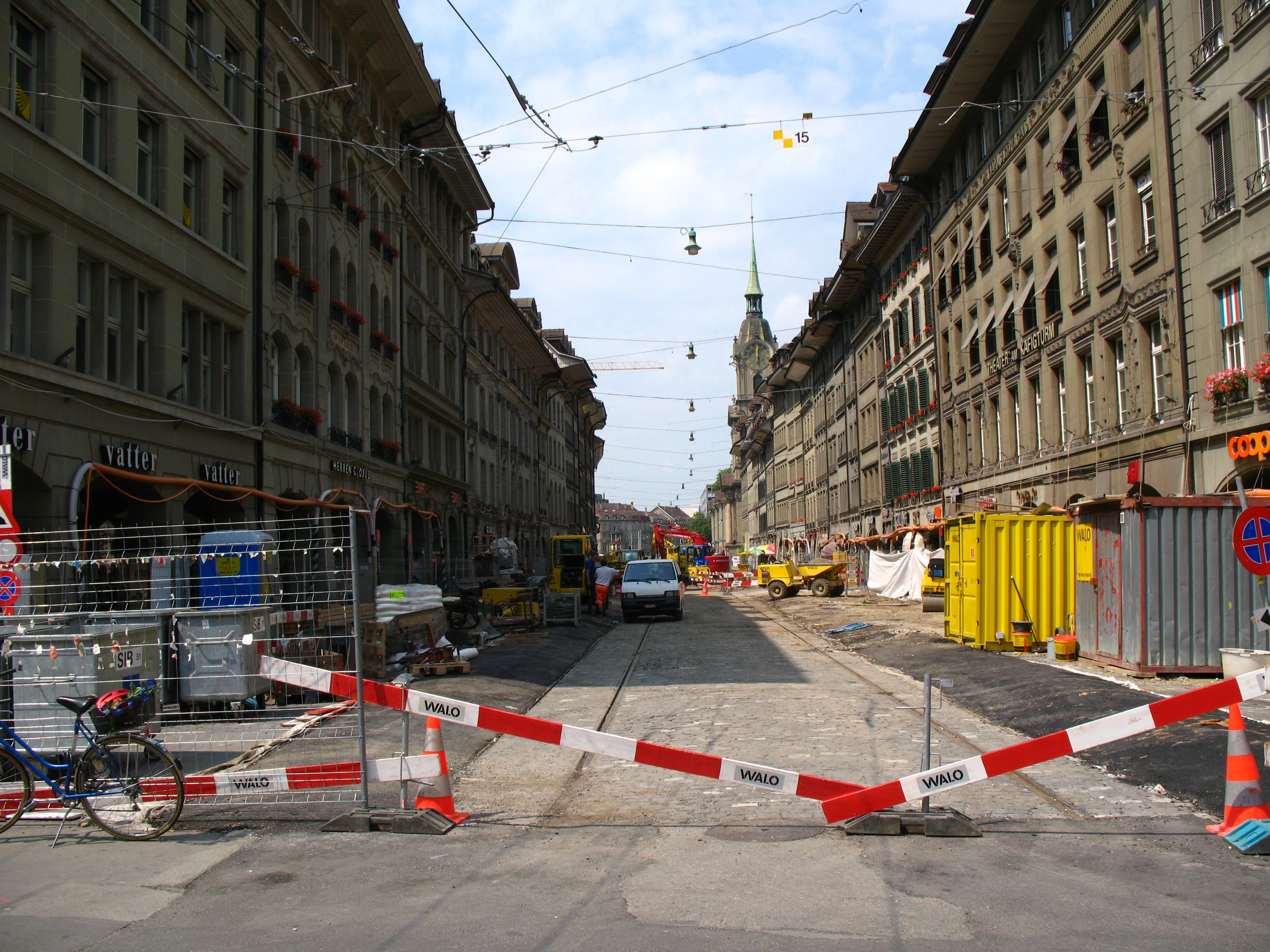
Spitalgasse, looking toward the Church of the Holy Ghost

Shortly before 1228, the Holy Ghost hospital and abbey were founded outside the city walls of Bern. While the hospital name changed to Oberer Spital (Upper Hospital) in 1307, when the Niedern Spital (Lower Hospital) was founded in what would later become Gerechtigkeitsgasse 2–10, the abbey and chapel retained the original name. As the city expanded it began to surround the hospital and abbey. Then, in the third expansion of the city from 1344 to 1346, the old Bümpliz road, which ran by the abbey, became part of the main road through Bern. In 1344 it was known as nüwe stat zem heiligen Geist for the abbey's name. However, by 1359 it was known as Spitalgasse after the Oberer Spital. Spitalgasse was an extension of the old Roman road from the east gate of Aventicum to Bümpliz In 1715 the Oberer and Niedern Spital merged into the Grossen Spital (Grand Hospital). The buildings on Spitalgasse were demolished in 1726/31 after the new Burgerspital was built.

== Sights ==
There are three Swiss heritage sites of national significance on Spitalgasse. They are; the houses at Spitalgasse 36 and 38 along with the passage, the Pfeiferbrunnen and the Reformed Holy Ghost Church at Spitalgasse 44.

=== Pfeiferbrunnen ===
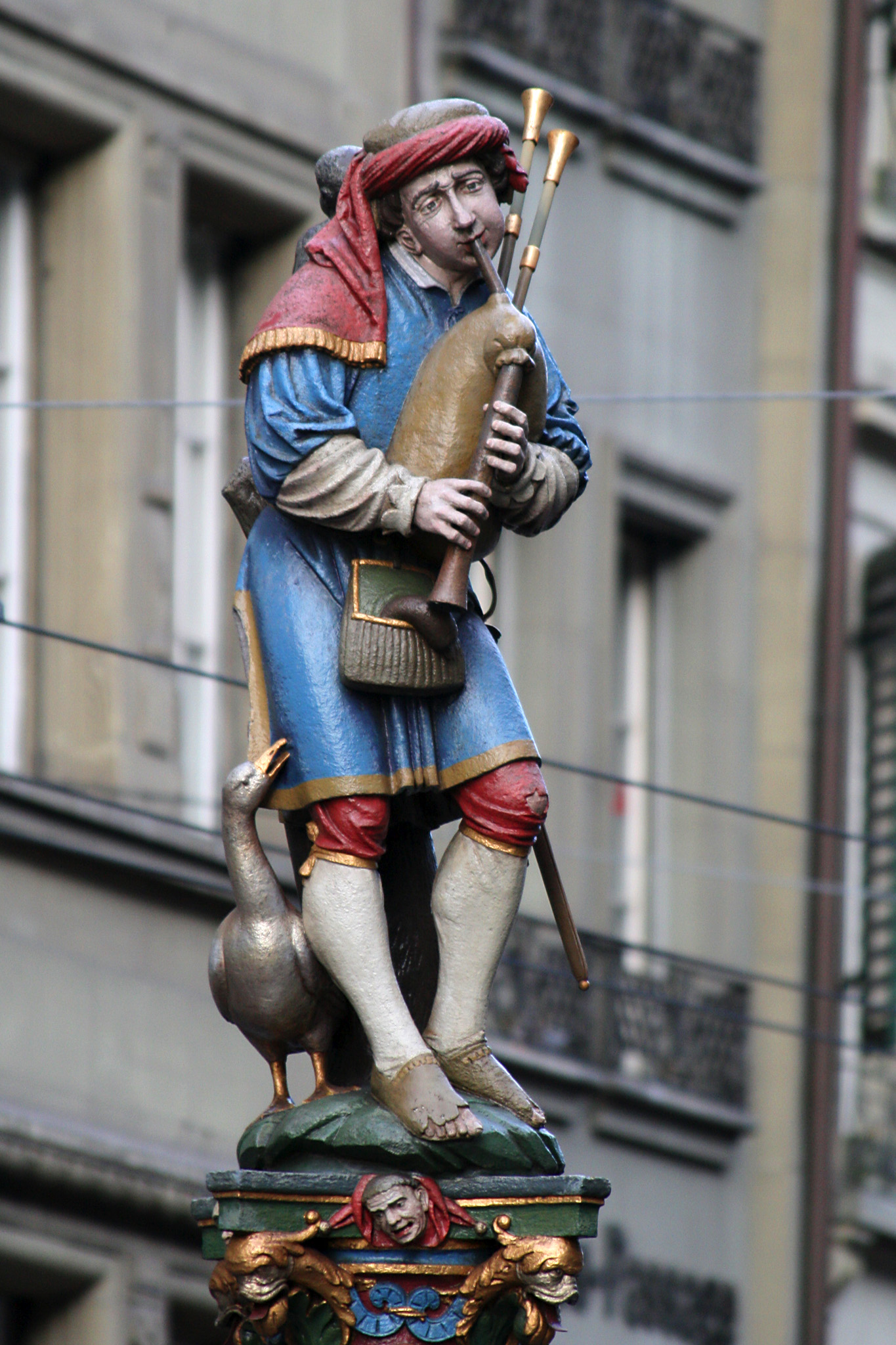
Pfeiferbrunnen

The Pfeiferbrunnen was built in 1545/46 by the Swiss Renaissance sculptor Hans Gieng, based on the 1514 Albrecht Dürer woodcut of the Bagpiper. Originally, it stood in front of the Gasthaus (hotel and restaurant) zum Kreuz, which was a hotel for traveling minstrels. In 1594 the building was renamed to Gasthof zum Storchen. Which led to the alternate name for the Pfeiferbrunnen, the Storchenbrunnen. This alternative name was popular until the end of the 19th century. During the renovation of 1874, an inscription was placed on the back of the statue, and the figures on the pillar were damaged. The current basin was built in 1889. Then, in 1919 the fountain was moved to the east from its original spot between Ryffli- and Storchengässchen, to its current location in front of Spitalgasse 21.

=== Church of the Holy Ghost ===
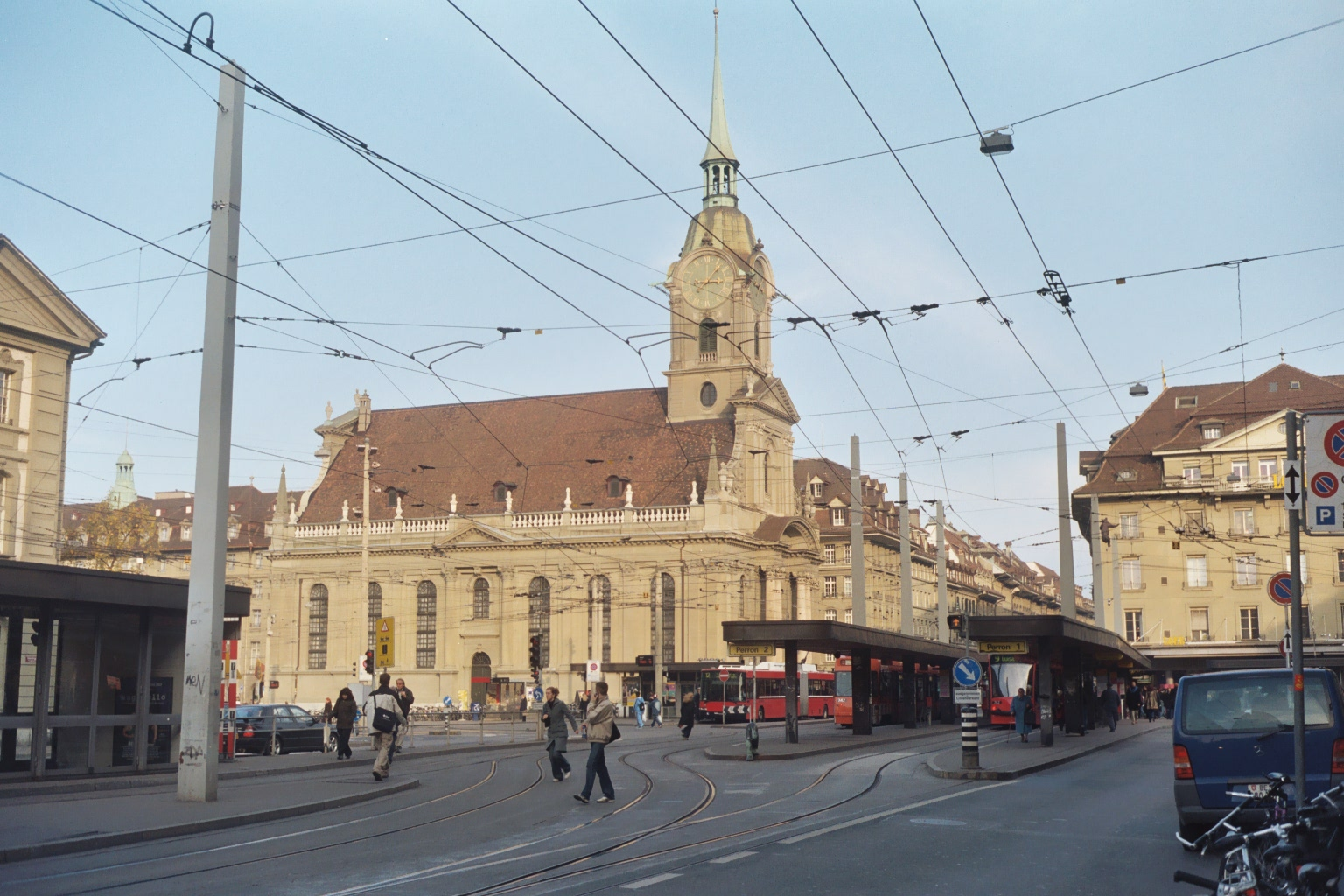
Church of the Holy Ghost

The first church on the site was a small church built shortly before the 1228 construction of the Holy Ghost hospital and abbey. This building was replaced by the second church in 1482–96. From 1528 to 1604 the church was secularized by the reformers. In 1604 it was again used for religious services, as the hospital church for the Oberer Spital. The second church was demolished in 1726 to make way for a new church building. Following an 11-year planning phase, in 1726–29 the third church was built by Niklaus Schiltknecht. The first organ in the new church was installed in 1804, and was replaced in 1933 by the second organ. The church has six bells, one of the two largest was cast in 1596 and the other in 1728. The four other bells were all cast in 1860. With about 2000 seats, it is one of the largest Reformed churches.

During the 1726 construction of the church, Roman religious objects were discovered under the foundation. From this find, it appears likely that the church sits on the site of an old Roman temple.
