= Schauplatzgasse =

Street in Bern, Switzerland

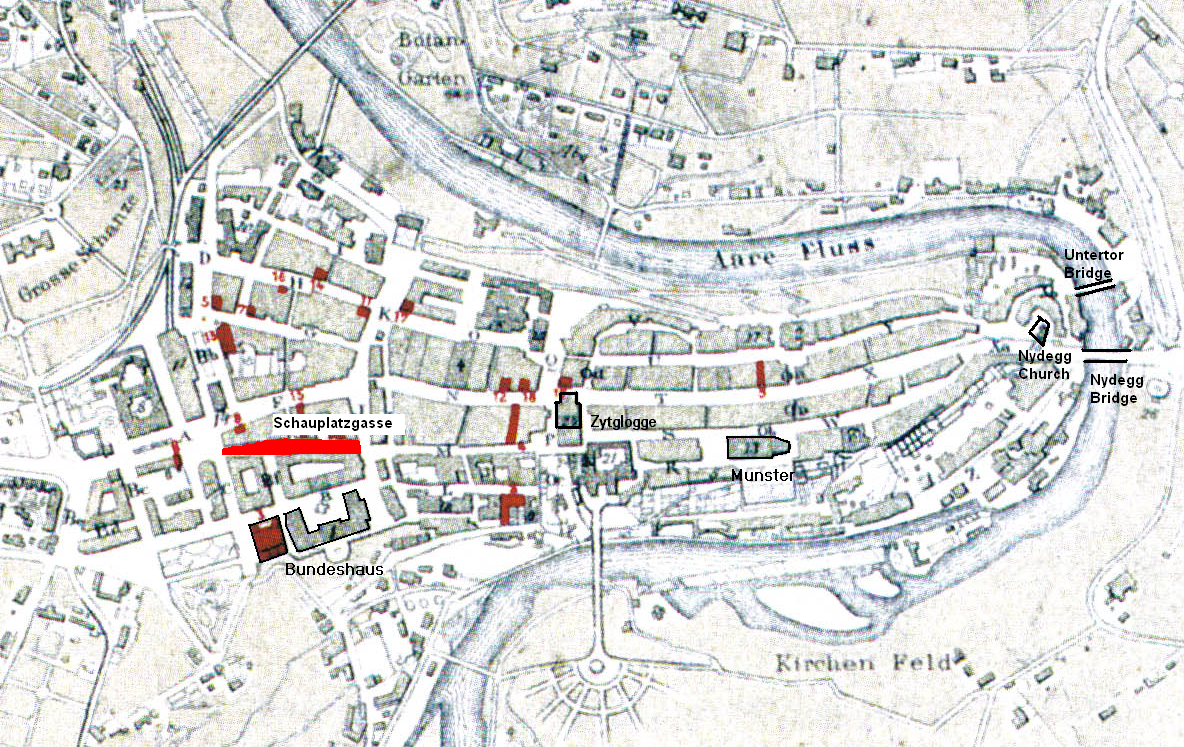
- Old City of Bern with Schauplatzgasse highlighted
- Former name(s): Schoulanzgasse
- Length: 200 m (660 ft)
- Location: Old City of Bern, Bern, Switzerland
- Postal code: 3011
- Coordinates: 46°56′50.56″N 7°26′31.87″E

The Schauplatzgasse is one of the streets in the Old City of Bern, the medieval city center of Bern, Switzerland. It is part of the Äussere Neustadt which was built during the third expansion from 1344 to 1346. It runs from Bundesplatz in front of the Bundeshaus to Bubenbergplatz and is part of the UNESCO Cultural World Heritage Site that encompasses the Old City.

== History ==
The street is first mentioned in 1347 as Schoulanzgasse, after a local noble family. After the Schoulant family died out, the street was known by a number of different names. The current name is first mentioned in 1732.
