= Church of the Holy Ghost, Bern =

Church of the Holy Ghost
- Heiliggeistkirche
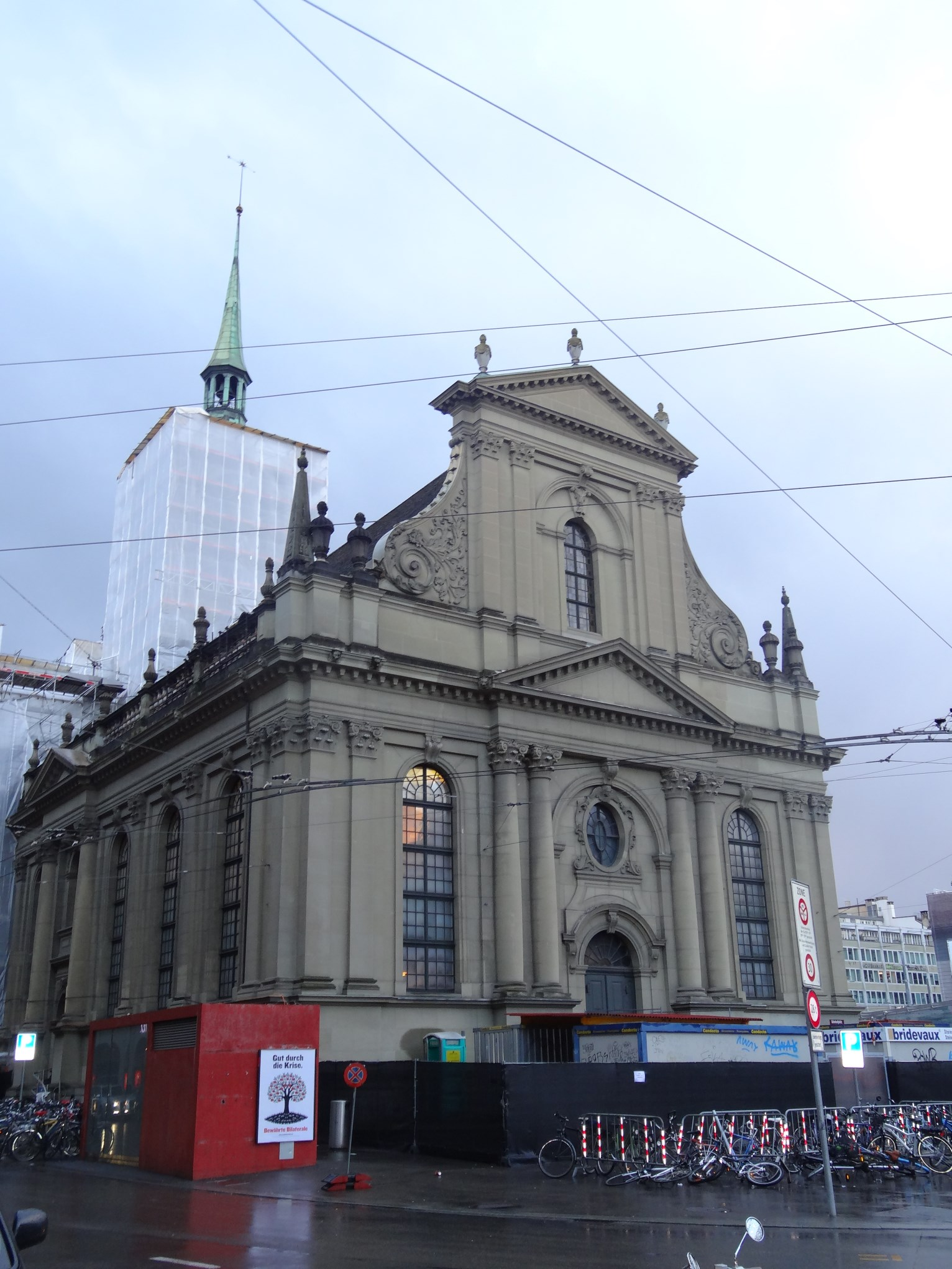
- Church of the Holy Ghost

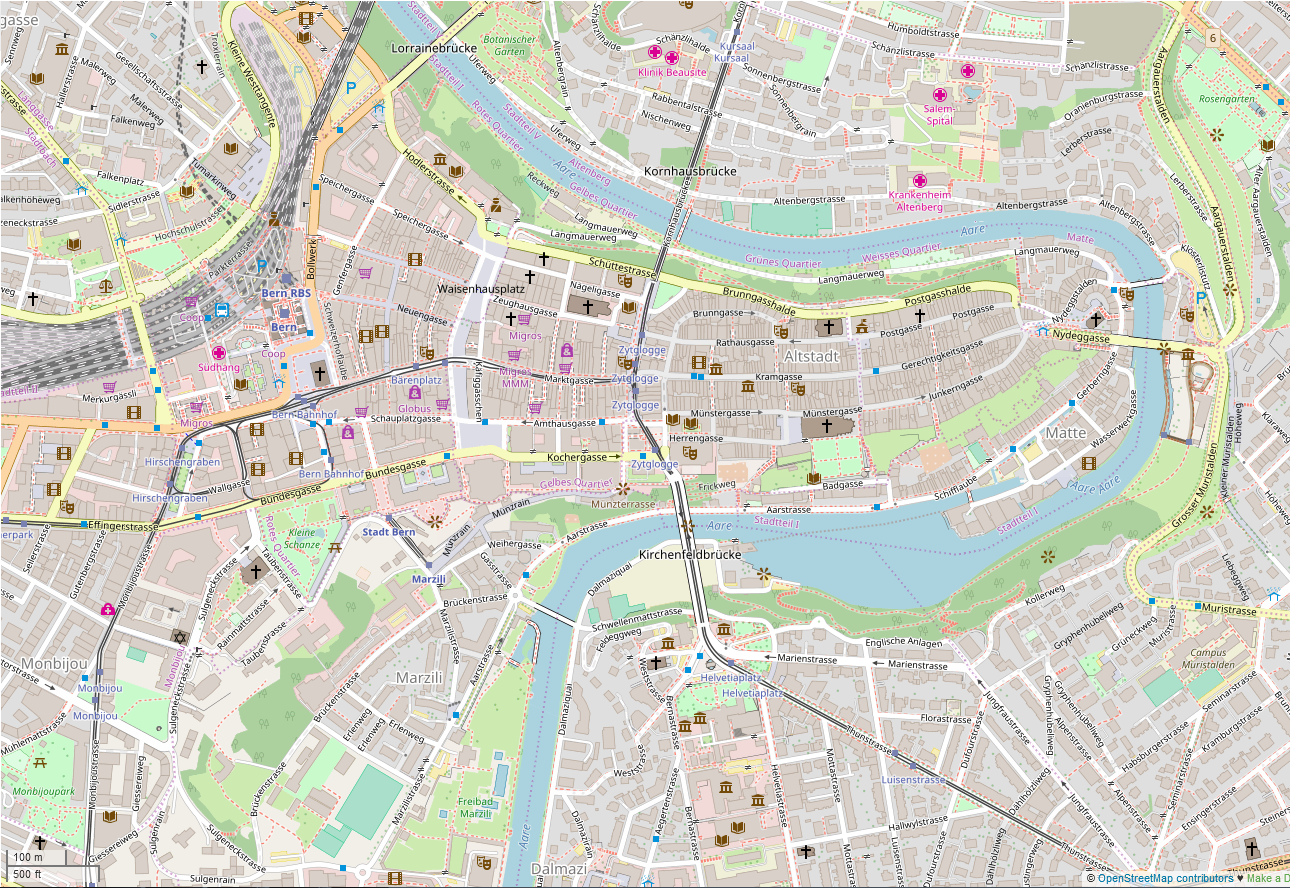
- 46°56′52.41″N 7°26′26.83″E
- Location: Bern
- Country: Switzerland
- Denomination: Swiss Reformed
- Website: www.heiliggeistkirche.ch

History
- Former name: Spitalkirche
- Status: Church
- Consecrated: 6 November 1729

Architecture
- Functional status: Active
- Heritage designation: Swiss inventory of cultural property of national and regional significance
- Architect: Niklaus Schiltkecht
- Style: Baroque
- Groundbreaking: April 1726
- Completed: October 1729
- Construction cost: 48,968.52 Krone

Specifications
- Length: 40.5 m (133 ft)
- Width: 24.9 m (82 ft)
- Height: 11.8 m (39 ft)
- Materials: Sandstone

The Church of the Holy Ghost (German: Heiliggeistkirche) is a Swiss Reformed Church in Bern, Switzerland. The Swiss heritage site of national significance building is located at Spitalgasse 44 in the Old City of Bern. It is one of largest Swiss Reformed churches in Switzerland.

== Early churches ==
The first church was a chapel built for the Holy Ghost hospital and abbey. The chapel, hospital, and abbey were first mentioned in 1228 and at the time sat about 150 meters (490 ft) outside the western gate in the first city wall. This building was replaced by the second church between 1482 and 1496. During the 15th century, the Holy Ghost Abbey began to slowly decline. In 1528, the church was secularized by the reformers and the last two monks at the Abbey were driven out of Bern. During the following years, it was used as a granary. In 1604 it was again used for religious services, as the hospital church for the Oberer Spital. At that time, the church had a maximum capacity of about 750. The second church was demolished in 1726 to make way for a new church building.

== Construction of the modern church ==
Following an 11-year planning phase, in 1726-29, the third church was built by Niklaus Schiltknecht. This church was built out of a local sandstone in the baroque style. Until 1865, it was located west of the Christoffelturm and the Christoffelturm Church. However, these buildings were demolished to make way for the new train station.

During the 1726 construction of the church, Roman religious objects were discovered under the foundation. From this find, it appears likely that the church sits on the site of an old Roman temple.

== Interior ==
The first organ in the new church was installed in 1804, and was replaced in 1933 by the second organ. The church has six bells, one of the two largest was cast in 1596 and the other in 1728. The four other bells were all cast in 1860. The interior is supported by 14 monolithic columns made of sandstone and has a free-standing pulpit in the northern part of the nave. Much like the St. Pierre Cathedral in Geneva, the Church of the Holy Ghost holds about 2,000 people and is one of the largest Protestant churches in Switzerland.

== Notable ministers ==
From 1693 to 1698, the hospital's chief minister was the Pietist theologian Samuel Heinrich König. In 1829 and 1830, the vicar of the church was the poet Jeremias Gotthelf.

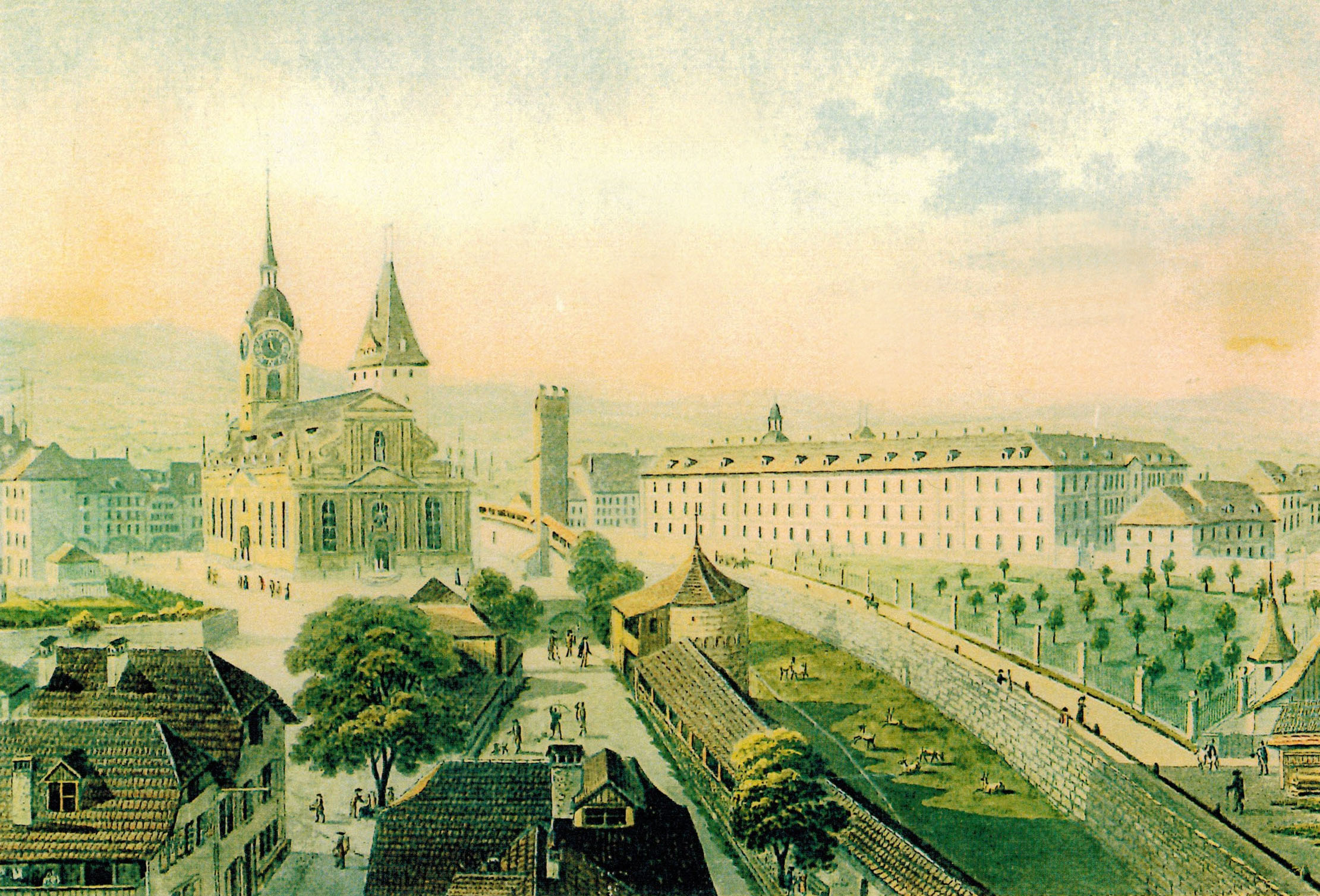
Church of the Holy Ghost and the Burgerspital in 1719

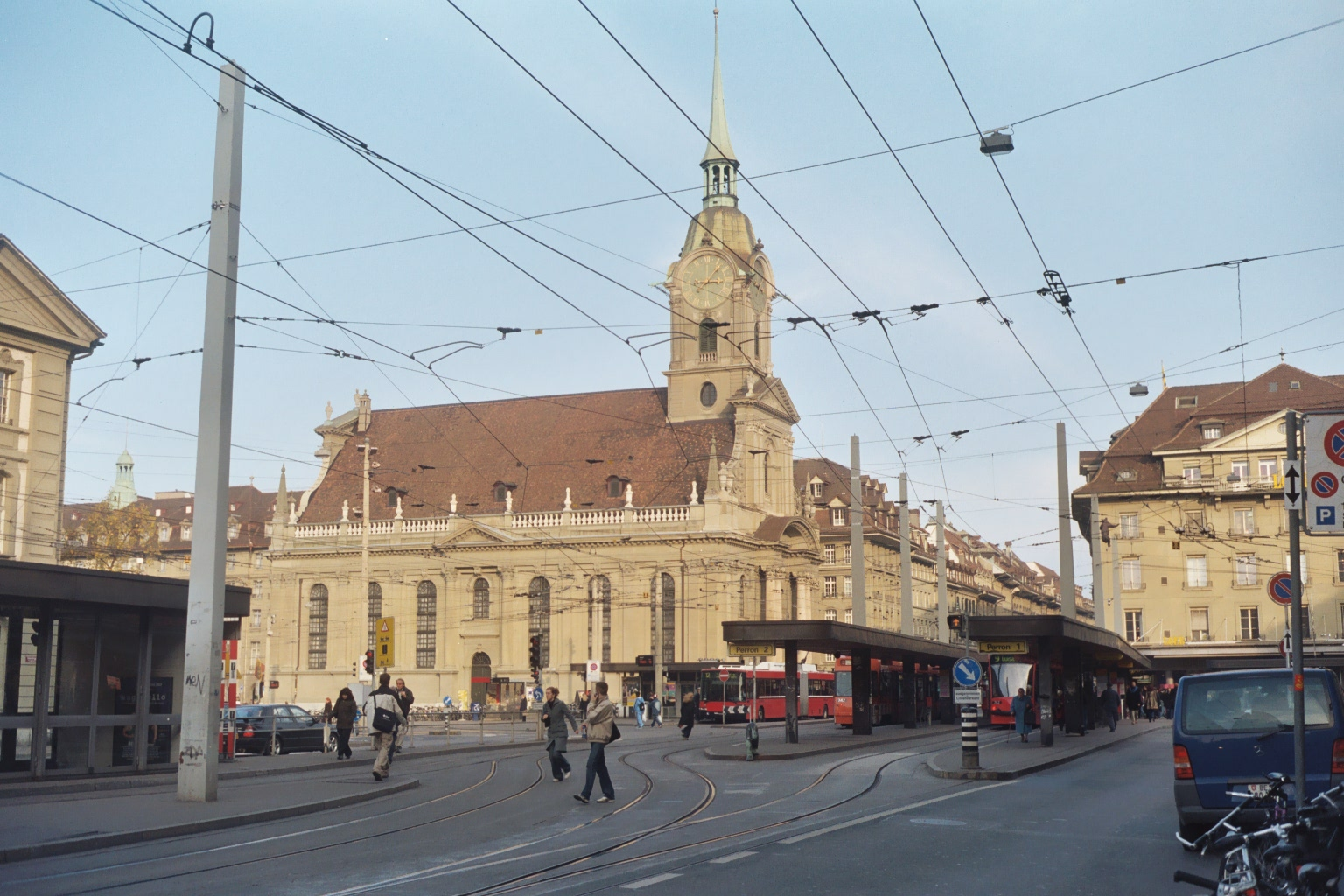
Bubenbergplatz with the Church of the Holy Ghost

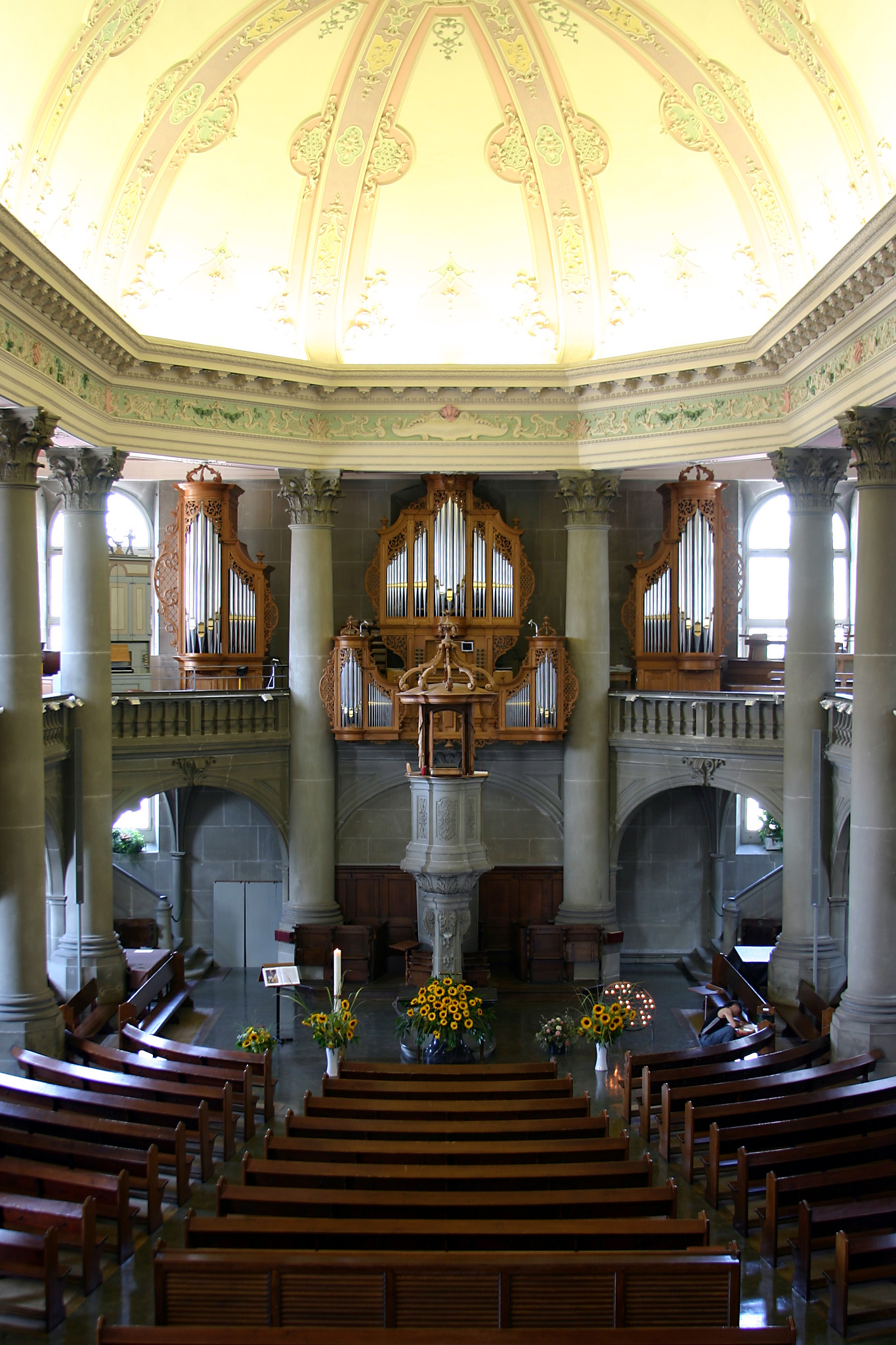
Interior
