= Aarbergergasse =

Street in Bern, Switzerland

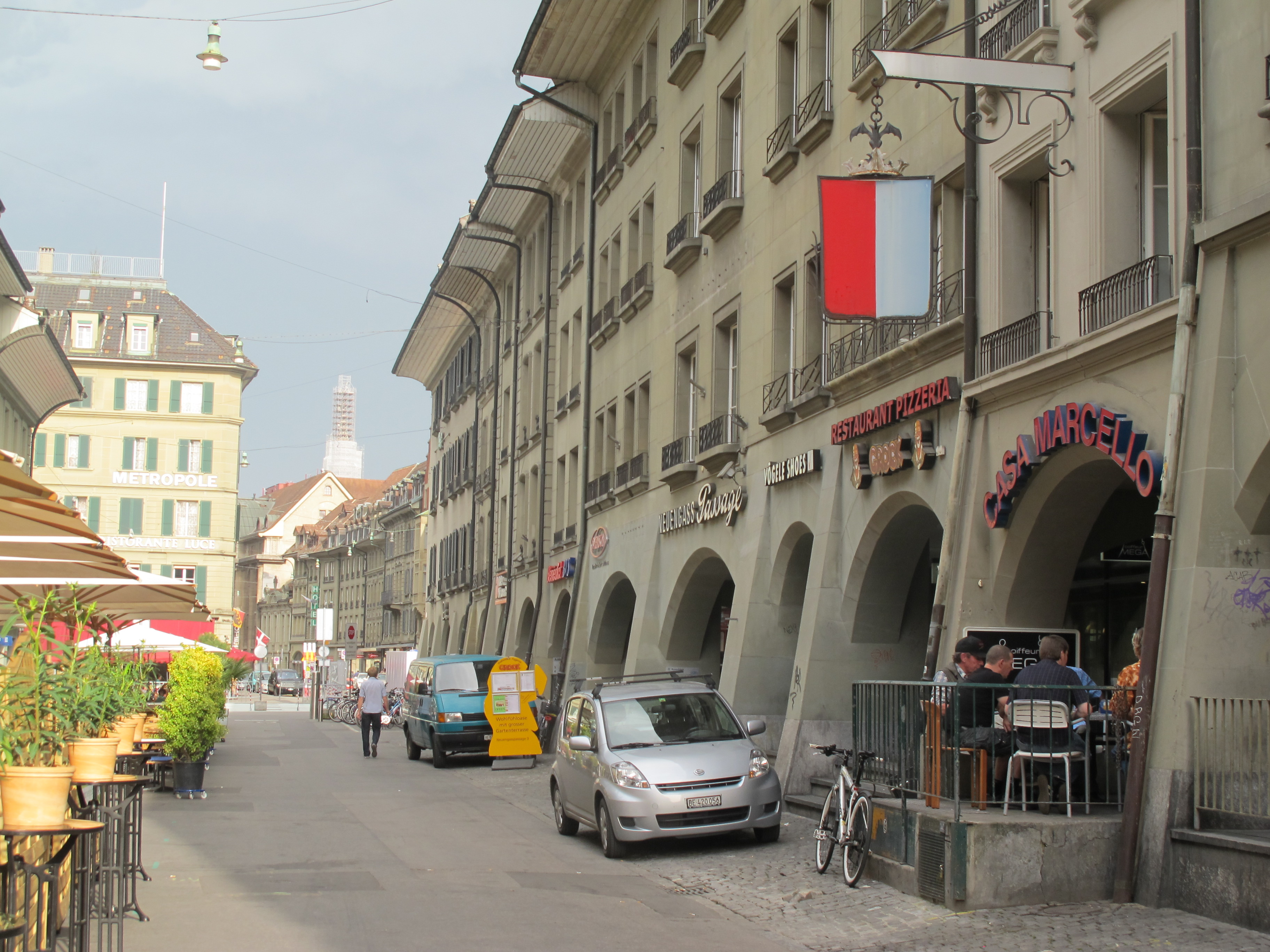
- Aarbergergasse in Bern
- Native name: Aarbergergasse (German)
- Former name(s): turn an colatten matten Golatenmattegasse
- Length: 300 m (980 ft)
- Location: Old City of Bern, Bern, Switzerland
- Postal code: 3011
- Coordinates: 46°56′59.52″N 7°26′35.19″E

The Aarbergergasse ('Aarberg Lane') is one of the streets in the Old City of Bern, the medieval city center of Bern, Switzerland. It was originally the most important of the five streets that were part of the Äussere Neustadt, which was the section outside the city walls. One fountain, the Ryfflibrunnen on the Aarbergergasse is listed on the Swiss inventory of heritage site of national significance and it is part of the UNESCO Cultural World Heritage Site that encompasses the Old City.

== Topography ==
Aarbergergasse was originally one of the most important streets in the unwalled Äussere Neustadt. Originally the street ran from the Golatenmatt tower, which was part of the outer city wall, to the Waisenhausplatz. The lane is divided into two different sections, one running west from Sternengässchen to the western end and the other running east from Sternengässchen to Waisenhausplatz. The western section is narrow, curved and lined with arcades. The houses were built with no central plan or unifying style. The eastern section is wider and straight with arcades only on the Schattseite (shadow side or southern side of the road).

== History ==
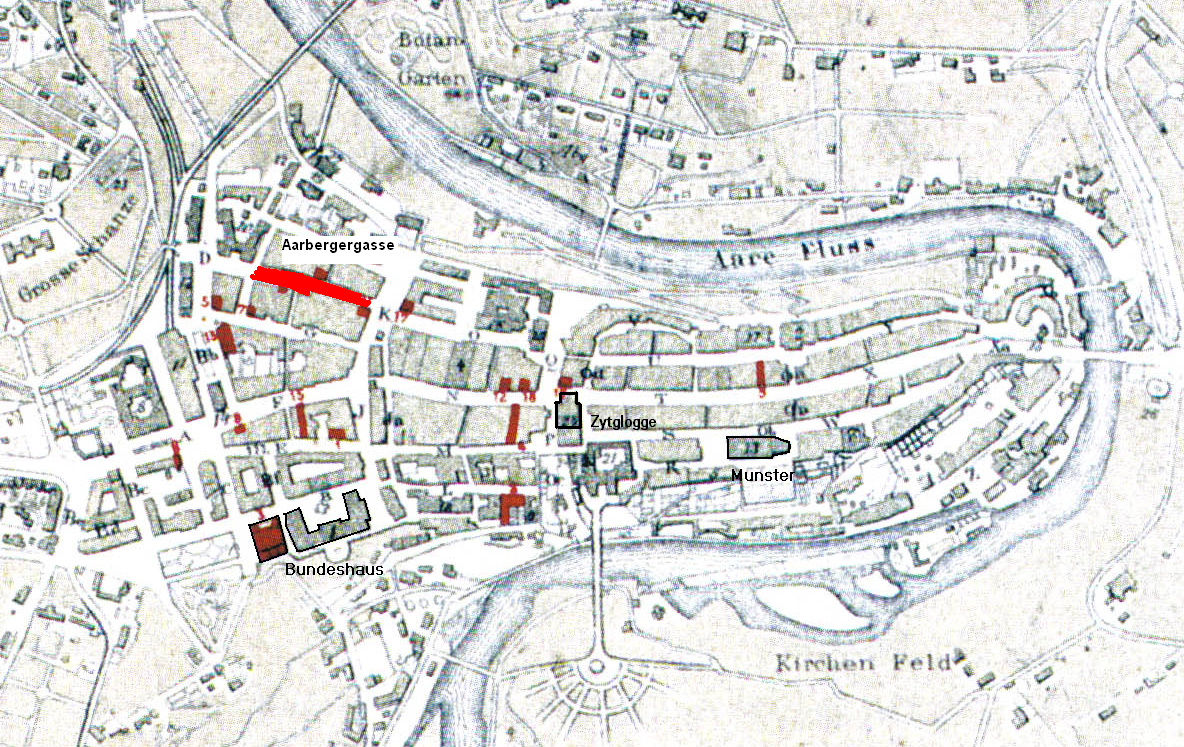
Old City of Bern with Aarbergergasse highlighted

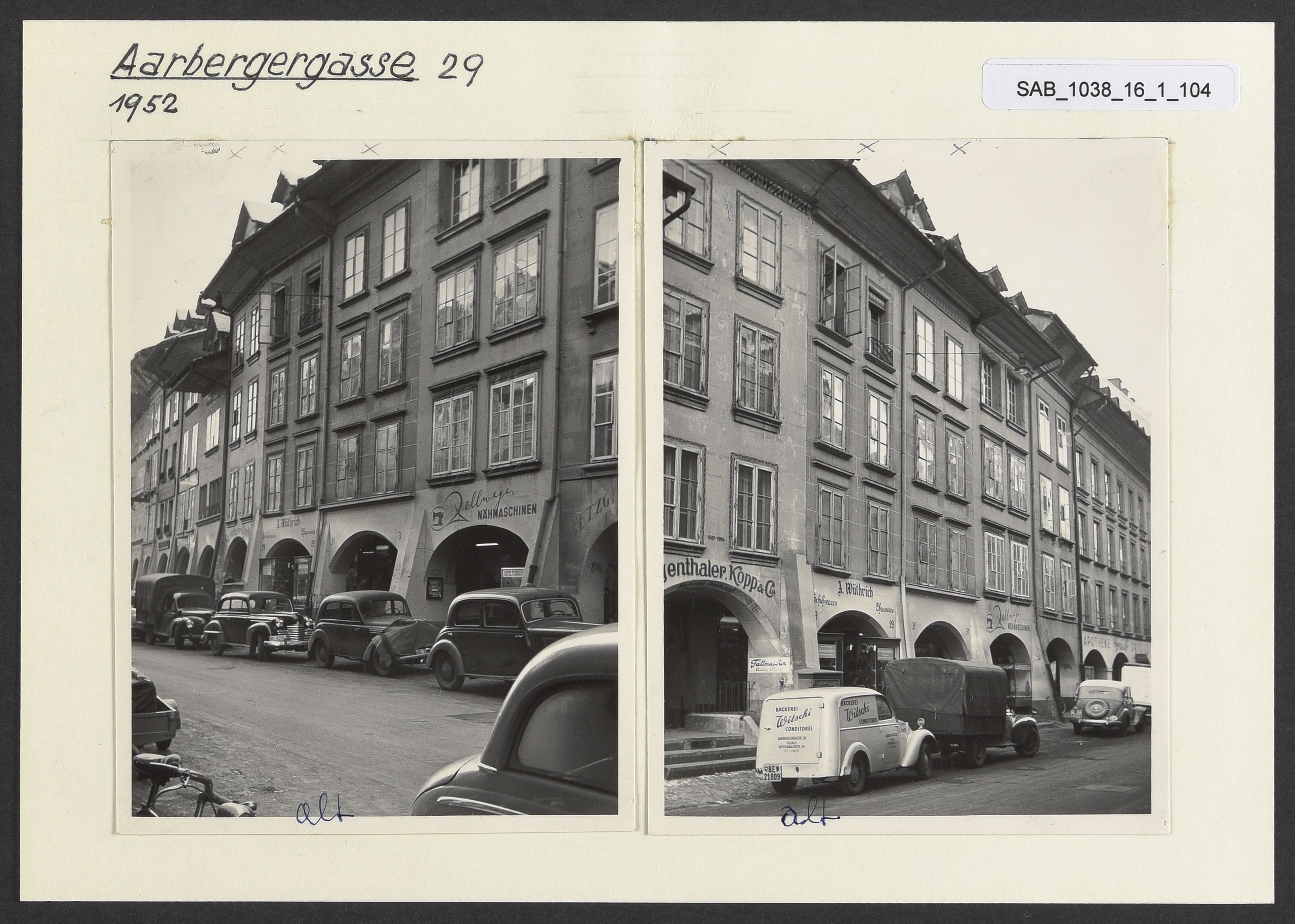
The Aarbergergasse in 1952

The region west of the Frauentor (the northern tower of the 2nd city wall) was known as golatunmattun as early as 1279. So, as the city expanded outside the Käfigturm wall into the Äussere Neustadt, the northernmost road (which would become Aarbergergasse) was first known as turn an colatten matten and then later shortened to Golatenmattgasse. The main roads to the north and northwest passed through this road because it led to the northernmost entrance into the city. When the 3rd city wall was built in 1344–46, the Golatenmatt gate was built at the end of Aarbergergasse. The name was officially changed in 1798, but wasn't adopted by the locals until the mid-19th Century.

In the night of 14/15 July 1575, a large fire broke out in the area. A total of 43 houses or other buildings were destroyed on Aarbergergasse, Waisenhausplatz and Neuengasse. The city quickly rebuilt 32 houses, paying for the construction from the city treasury. The original wooden buildings were replaced with sandstone walled houses. This was last major reconstruction project of the Old City of Bern.

In the 17th-20th Centuries, all the buildings, except for Aarbergergasse 25, were enlarged with additional stories. Nearly all the buildings changed the style of windows over these centuries. However, most of the rest of the architectural elements have remained unchanged.
