= Gerechtigkeitsbrunnen (Bern) =

Fountain in the Old City of Bern, Switzerland

Coordinates: 46.948296°N 7.454063°E

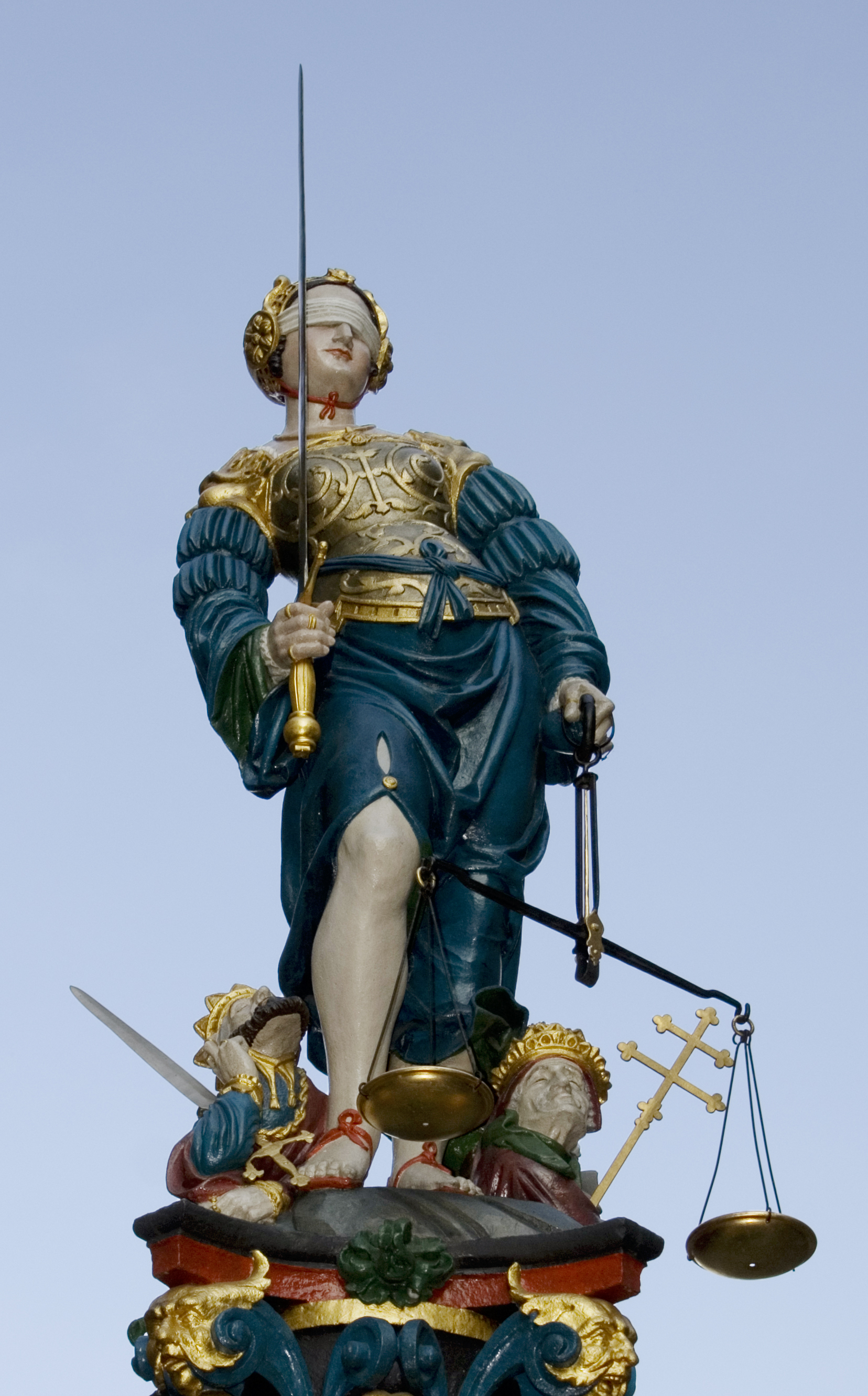
The statue of Lady Justice on the Gerechtigkeitsbrunnen

The Gerechtigkeitsbrunnen (Fountain of Justice) is a 16th-century fountain in the Gerechtigkeitsgasse in the Old City of Bern, Switzerland. It is the only Bernese fountain to retain all original design elements, and is listed as a cultural heritage of national significance.

Thanks to its namesake figure, Hans Gieng's famous statue of Lady Justice, the Gerechtigkeitsbrunnen surpasses all other Bernese fountains in artistic merit. The iconic figure was copied throughout Switzerland up until the middle of the 17th century. The statue is a copy of the original, which was largely destroyed by vandals in 1986.

== Fountain ==
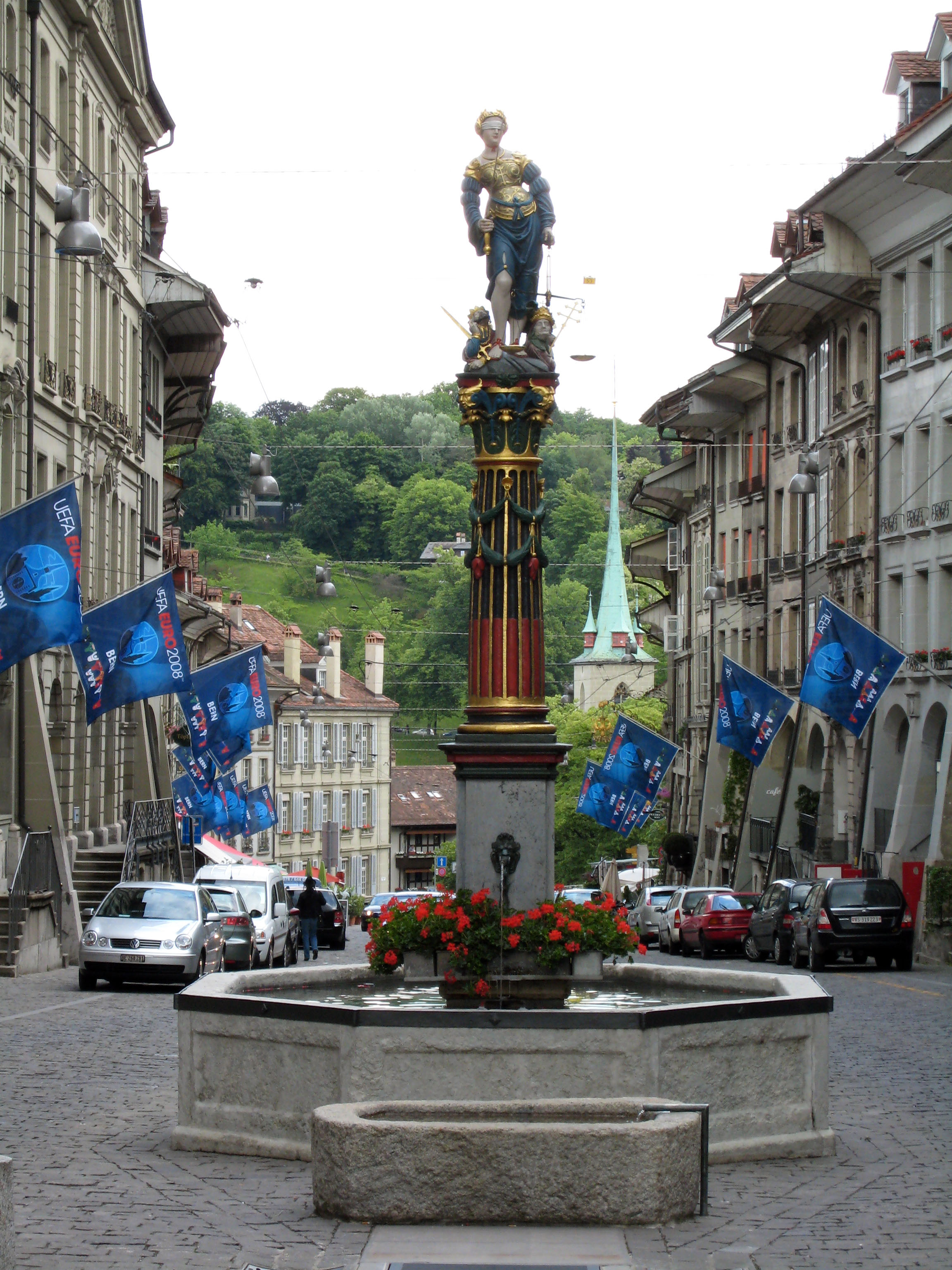
The fountain as seen from the west

The fountain consists of an octagonal main basin and two smaller spillover basins. The main basin, made out of unadorned limestone plates held together with an iron ring, bears the date of one of the renovations, MDCCCXLV. In the centre of the main basin, bronze tubes emerge from the central pedestal, which was replaced in 1949. Atop it stands a narrow, festooned stone pillar decorated by an acanthus frieze.

== Statue ==
The life-sized statue on the pillar is Iustitia, "Lady Justice", the personification of justice. She is portrayed standing in gracious counterpoise holding her traditional attributes—sword of justice in her right hand, a balance in her left hand and a blindfold over her eyes. Her costume is fashioned in an antique manner, with sandaled feet, one knee bared, wearing a decorative golden suit of armour adorned with bas-relief arabesques over her blue robes.

At the feet of Justice, four smaller busts crowd the pedestal: a Pope, an Emperor, a Sultan and a Schultheiss, whose golden chain of office is believed to have originally borne the Bernese arms. All figures have closed their eyes as in submission. They represent the Four Earthly Powers, the four forms of government according to Renaissance humanism: theocracy (the Pope), monarchy (the Emperor), autocracy (the Sultan) and the republic (the Schultheiss).

=== Symbolism ===
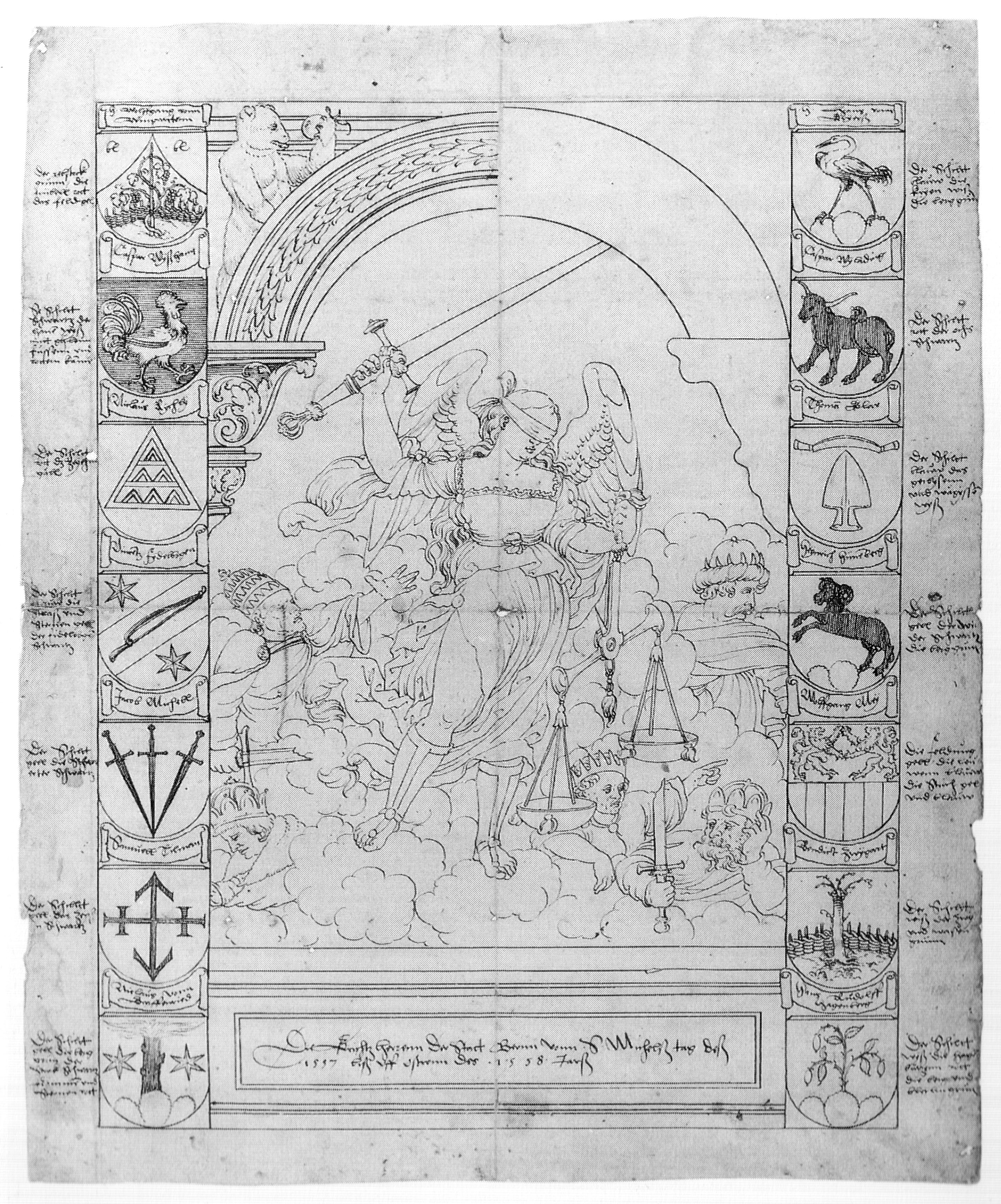
Manuel's drawing of a winged Justice, contemporary to Gieng's statue

The ensemble represents the supremacy of Justice over all Earthly authorities; a variant of the medieval pictorial formula of virtue defeating vice. The contemporary belief in the divine nature of Justice is made more apparent in a 1558 Bernese drawing for a stained-glass window by Hans Rudolf Manuel; there, a winged Justice strides over the heads of princes whose symbols of power are broken. Divine Justice was a frequent element of political discourse in Reformation-era Bern. In the view of the reformators, doing justice according to God's word was the highest duty of all authority, superseding feudal rights. Such arguments were used, among others, to justify Bern's conquest of Vaud in 1536 from the dukes of Savoy.

While the sword and scales are traditional attributes of Iustitia, the Bernese statue's blindfold is a novelty; only later did it become a common element in personifications of Justice and a general symbol for the principle of equality before the law. The blindfold implies that justice ought to be done without respect to rank or standing; that a just verdict is arrived at through introspection rather than with a view to outward looks. Gieng's Iustitia is a symbol of republican justice, and was a forceful public reminder of the Bernese Republic's authority through law.

=== Influence ===
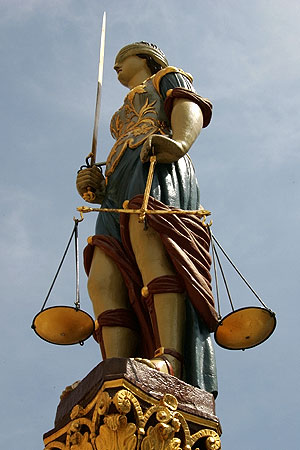
The figure of Justice on the Gerechtigkeitsbrunnen in Biel is one of many influenced by Gieng's work

Gieng's Iustitia was greatly influential on fountain designers up until the middle of the 17th century. In Switzerland alone, eleven "fountains of Justice" remain, and several others have probably been destroyed. Direct copies exist in Solothurn (1561), Lausanne (1585), Boudry, Cudrefin and Neuchâtel; designs influenced by the Bernese statue are found in Aarau (1643), Biel, Burgdorf, Brugg, Zürich and Luzern.

== History ==
The fountain was constructed in 1543, essentially in its current state, to complement an older well at the Nydegg. Its current name is first recorded in 1687. Renovations are recorded in 1584, 1589, 1668 and 1687. The sword and balance were removed, allegedly by the invading French, in 1798 and disappeared for many years; they and the figures' other paraphernalia have frequently been replaced. The figure was repainted in 1890 by Christian Bühler and in 1925 by Victor Surbek. In 1949, parts of the pedestal were replaced.

=== Vandalism ===
The statue after its destruction in 1986

After having stood in place for 443 years, the statue was torn down after midnight on 13 October 1986 by means of a rope and tackle. It was largely destroyed by the fall. The act was not claimed by anyone, but was generally attributed to the Groupe Bélier, a militant youth organisation advocating Jurassic separatism. At that time, the Béliers frequently engaged in acts of vandalism to express the Jurassian separatists' outrage over allegations of irregularities in the plebiscites of 1974–75 that caused the Bernese Jura to not join the canton of Jura; and over what was, according to the separatists, a cover-up of these irregularities by the Bernese and federal authorities.

Only one person was ever implicated in the destruction of the statue. Pascal Hêche, a 29-year-old mechanic and Bélier, retracted his initial confession and pleaded not guilty to having participated in the attack. The Bernese courts sentenced him to 22 months' confinement and to the payment of CHF 200,000 in damages; the judgment was upheld by the Federal Supreme Court in 1991 and 1992.

Since the attack, the damaged statue has been in the process of restoration at the city's historical museum. The statue in place since 1988 is a copy.

== Bibliography ==
- Caviezel, Zita; Herzog, Georges; Keller, Jürg A. (2006), Basel-Landschaft, Basel-Stadt, Bern, Solothurn, Kunstführer durch die Schweiz, vol. 3 (1st ed.), Bern: Gesellschaft für Schweizerische Kunstgeschichte, p. 164, ISBN 3-906131-97-1
- Gamboni, Dario (1997), The destruction of art: iconoclasm and vandalism since the French Revolution, Reaktion Books, ISBN 0-948462-94-9
- Hofer, Paul (1952), Die Stadt Bern, Kunstdenkmäler des Kantons Bern, vol. 1, Basel: Gesellschaft für Schweizerische Kunstgeschichte / Verlag Birkhäuser, pp. 314–321, ISBN 3-906131-13-0, archived from the original on 17 December 2014
- Schneeberger, Ursula (2006), "Zuo beschirmen die gerechtikeÿtt, (...) un wer es allen fürsten leytt. Staat, Krieg und Moral im Programm der Berner Figurenbrunnen", in Holenstein, André (ed.), Berns mächtige Zeit: Das 16. und 17. Jahrhundert neu entdeckt, Berner Zeiten, vol. 3, Schulverlag blmv AG und Stämpfli Verlag AG, pp. 157–161, ISBN 3-292-00417-9, ISBN 3-7272-1276-4
