= Bahnhofplatz =

City square in Bern, Switzerland

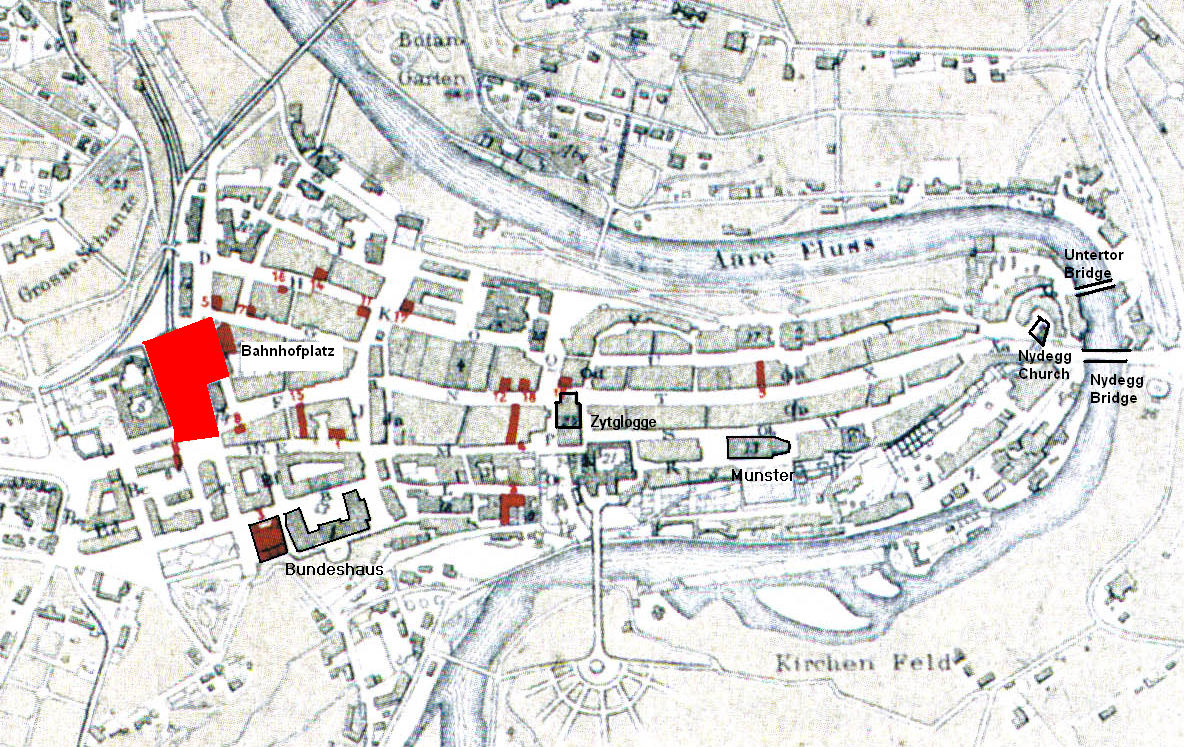
- Old City of Bern with Bahnhofplatz highlighted
- Interactive map of Bahnhofplatz
- Location: Old City of Bern, Bern, Switzerland
- Postal code: 3011
- Coordinates: 46°56′52.82″N 7°26′25.11″E

Construction
- Completion: 1832

The Bahnhofplatz (German pronunciation: [ˈbaːnhoːfˌplats], lit. 'train station square') is a plaza just outside the Old City of Bern, the medieval city center of Bern, Switzerland. It was built following the destruction of the Christoffelturm which had been part of the third city wall. It is located north of Bubenbergplatz and surrounds the Heiliggeistkirche and Bern's central train station. It is part of the UNESCO Cultural World Heritage Site that encompasses the Old City.

== History ==
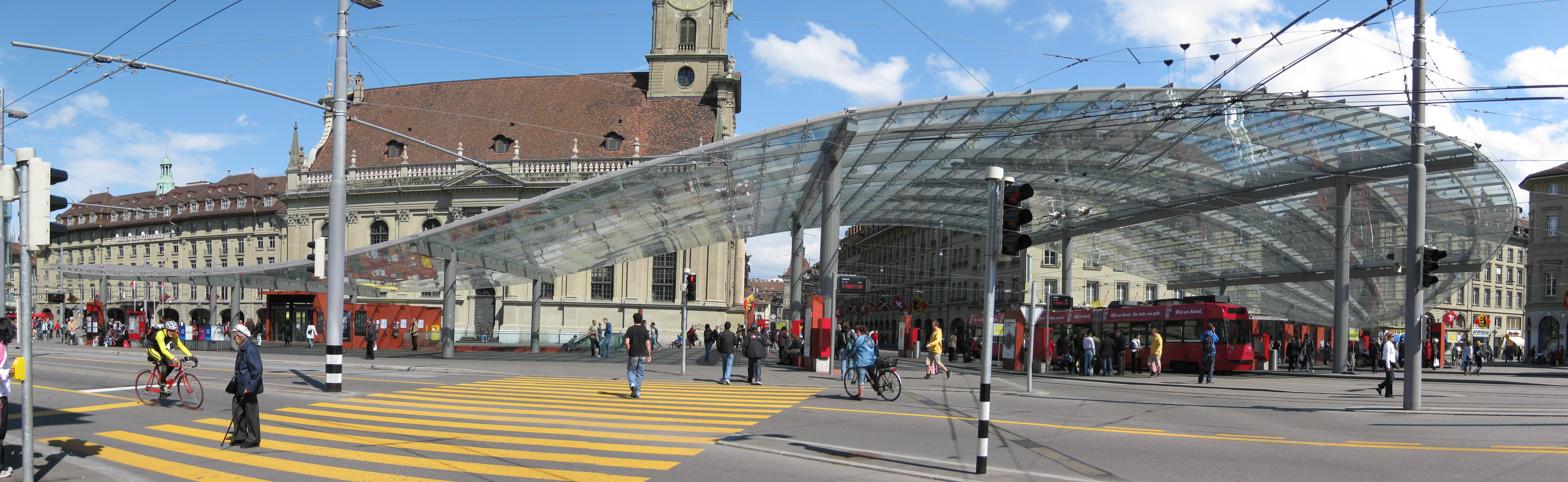
Bahnhofplatz with the Heiliggeistkirche in the background

Following the destruction of the third city wall and the Christoffelturm in 1830-32, a plaza was opened up between the Burgerspital and Neuengasse. Initially the plaza was known as Kasernenplatz (Barracks Plaza) due to the neighboring cavalry barracks, though the name quickly changed to Spitalplatz (Hospital Plaza) due to the nearby Burgerspital. The plaza was the site of the cabbage market in Bern.

In June 1857, the SCB (German: Schweizerische Centralbahn, or Swiss Central Train Line) completed a line between Basel and Bern. Then, two years later the Bern-Thun line opened and on 2 July 1860 another line reached Thörishaus, now part of Köniz. While the rail lines were being built, a central train station was built on the northern end of the plaza. During the construction of the new station, the plaza was renamed Bahnhofplatz. On 1 January 1901, the SCB was nationalized and the Bern station went over to the newly formed Swiss Federal Railways.
