= Kornhausplatz =

Square in Bern, Switzerland

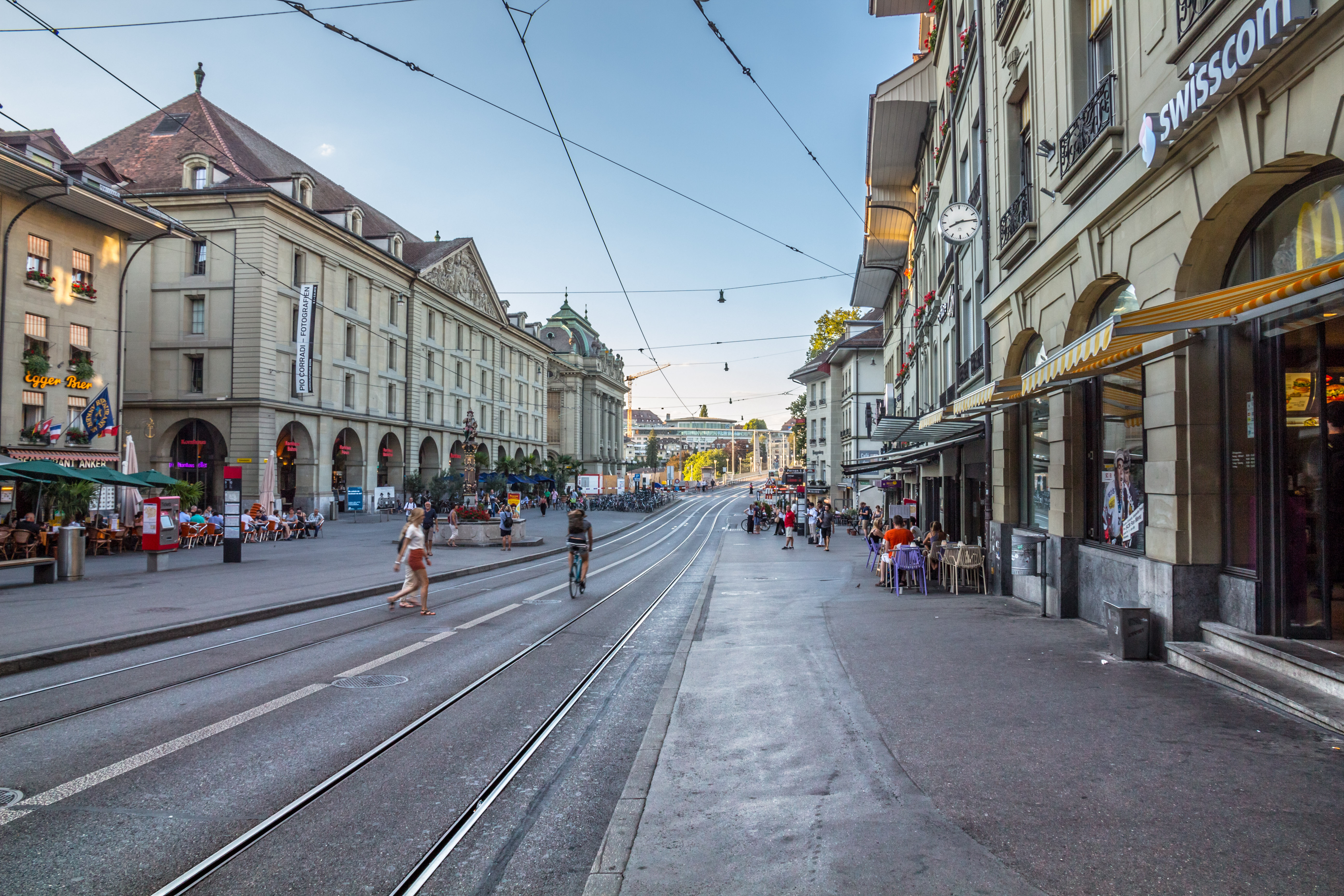
- Location: Old City of Bern, Bern, Switzerland
- Postal code: 3011
- Coordinates: 46°56′54.67″N 7°26′50.99″E

Construction
- Completion: 1405

The Kornhausplatz is a plaza in the Old City of Bern, the medieval city center of Bern, Switzerland. It is on the edge of the Zähringerstadt which was built during the founding of the city in 1191, though the plaza wasn't built until later. It is located near the Kornhausbrücke (Kornhaus bridge) and the Zytglogge clock tower. It is part of the UNESCO Cultural World Heritage Site that encompasses the Old City.

== History ==
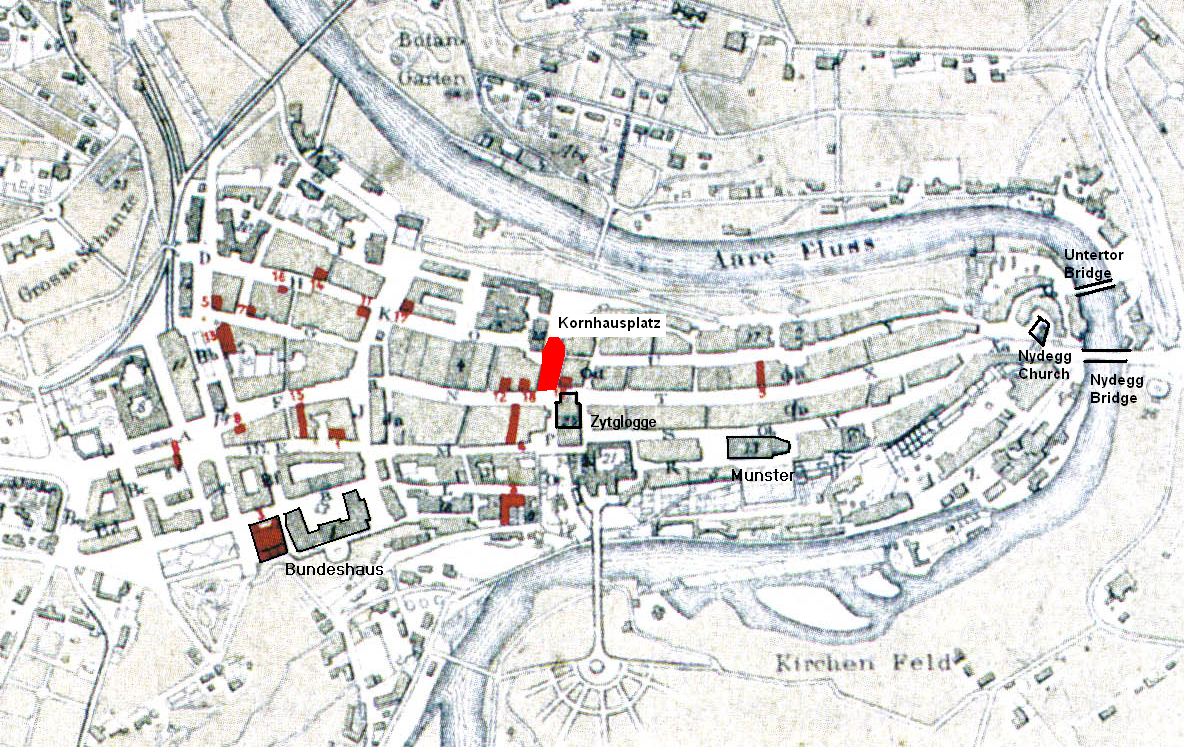
Old City of Bern with Kornhausplatz highlighted

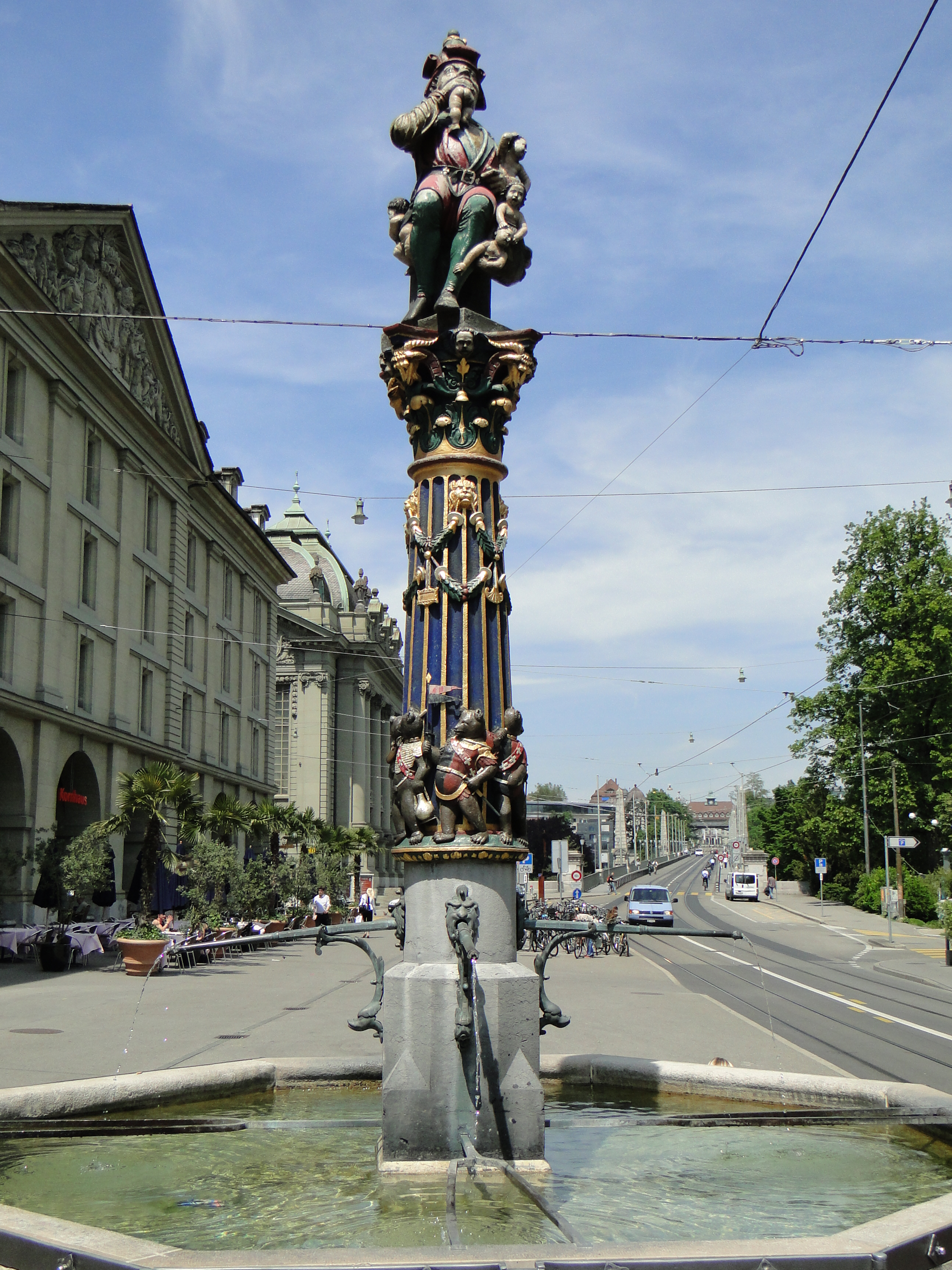
Kindlifresser fountain on Kornhausplatz looking toward the Kornhausbrücke.

Kornhausplatz was originally the ditch around the first city wall. Following the Great Fire of 1405 the ditch (known as the Steininbrügg-Graben) was filled in to form a plaza. For about three centuries, it was known as Platz (literally: plaza or place). In 1545 or 1546 the Kindlifresserbrunnen (Bernese German for Child Eater Fountain) was built by Hans Gieng in place of a wooden fountain on the Platz. Originally it was known as Platzbrunnen (Place Fountain), though the current name was used first in 1666.

In 1711-1715 the Kornhaus (German for granary) was built on the western side of the Platz. Following the construction of the Kornhaus, the Platz was known as Kornhausplatz or Kornmarkt (Grain market).
