= Pfeiferbrunnen =

Fountain in Bern, Switzerland

Coordinates: 46.948098°N 7.442384°E

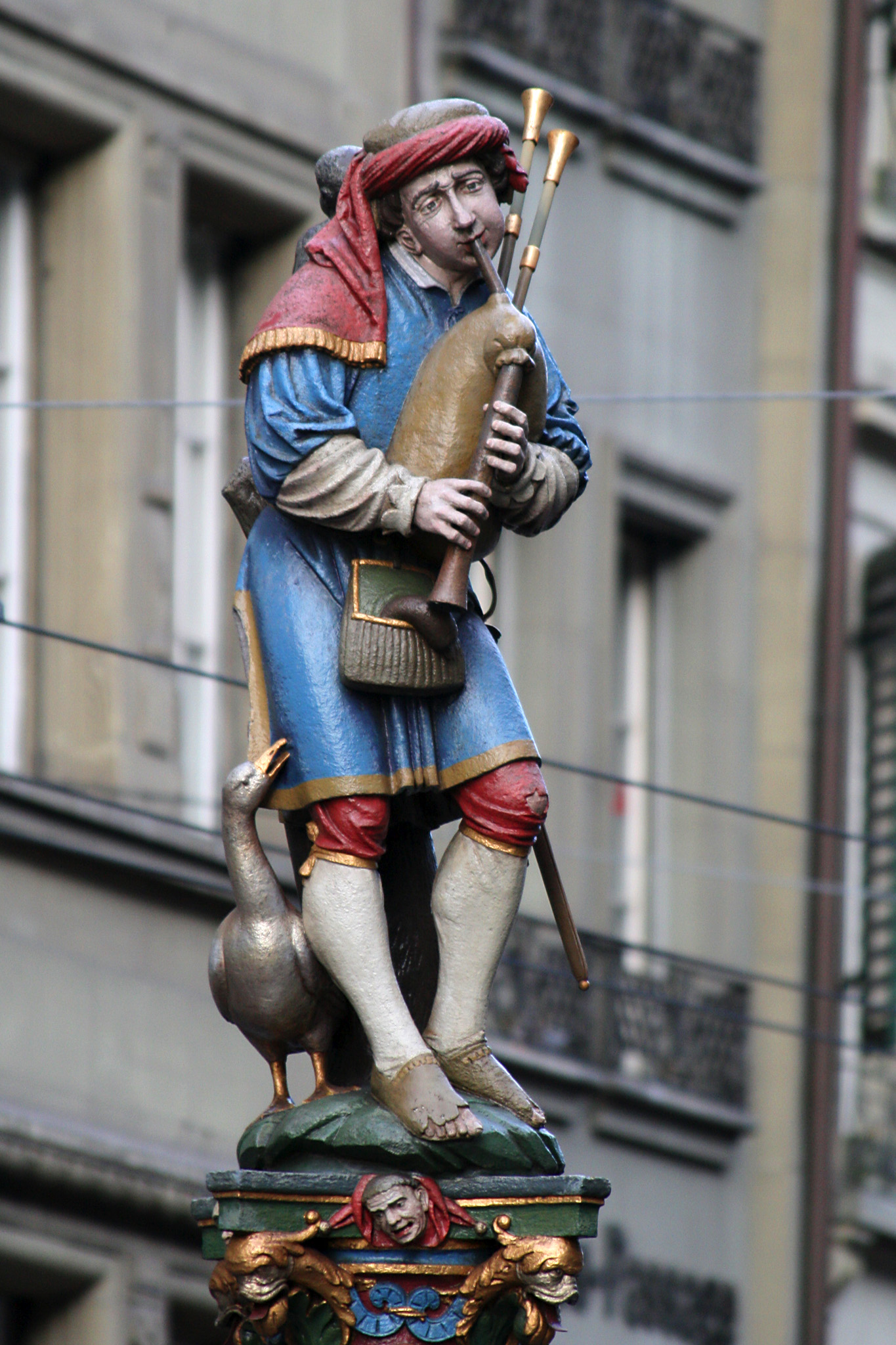

The Pfeiferbrunnen is a fountain near Spitalgasse 21 in Bern, Switzerland. It is one of the Old City of Bern's 16th-century fountains and is part of the list of Swiss heritage sites of national significance.

The Pfeiferbrunnen was built in 1545–46 by the Swiss Renaissance sculptor Hans Gieng, based on the 1514 Albrecht Dürer woodcut of the Bagpiper. Originally, it stood in front of the Gasthaus (hotel and restaurant) zum Kreuz, which was a hotel for traveling minstrels. In 1594 the building was renamed to Gasthof zum Storchen. Which led to the alternate name for the Pfeiferbrunnen, the Storchenbrunnen. This alternative name was popular until the end of the 19th century. During the renovation of 1874, an inscription was placed on the back of the statue, and the figures on the pillar were damaged. The current basin was built in 1889. Then, in 1919 the fountain was moved to the east from its original spot between Ryffli- and Storchengässchen, to its current location in front of Spitalgasse 21.
