= Kindlifresserbrunnen =

16th-century fountain in Bern, Switzerland

Coordinates: 46°56′54.67″N 7°26′50.81″E

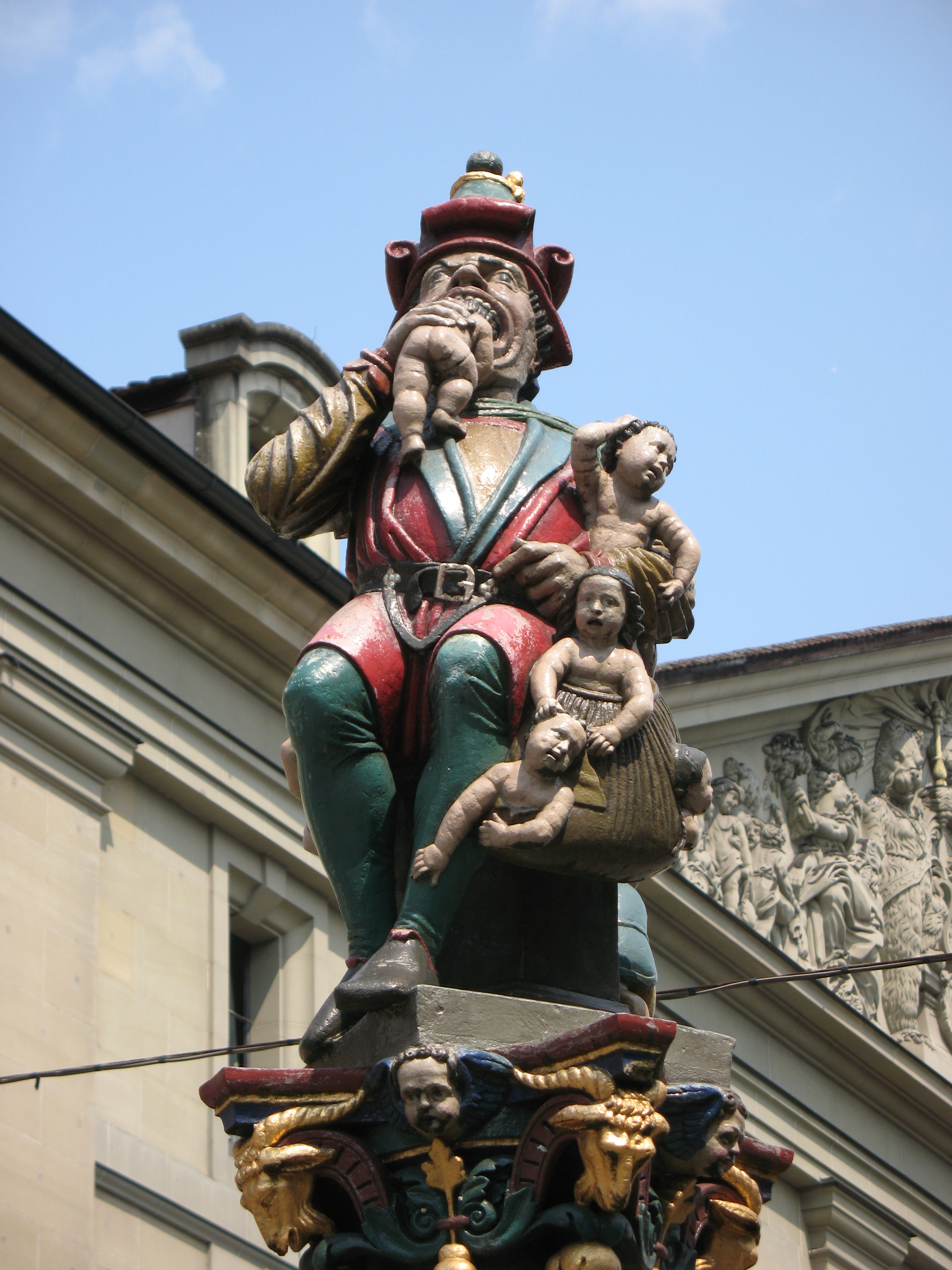
Kindlifresserbrunnen sculpture.

The Kindlifresserbrunnen ([kɪntliˈfʁɛsɐˌbʁʊ.nən], Swiss German for "Child-Eater Fountain") is a painted stone fountain at the Kornhausplatz (Granary Place) in Bern, Switzerland. It is one of the Old City of Bern's fountains from the 16th century.

== Creation and naming ==
It was created in 1545–1546 by Hans Gieng to replace a wooden fountain from the 15th century. The new fountain's original name was Platzbrunnen (Plaza Fountain); the current name was used first in 1666. Kindli is a Swiss German diminutive for the German word Kind, meaning child. A literal translation of the name Kindlifresserbrunnen therefore would be "Fountain of the Eater of Little Children".

== Interpretations ==
The fountain sculpture depicts a seated ogre devouring a naked child. Placed at his side is a bag containing more children. Because the ogre is wearing a pointed hat resembling a Jewish one, it has been speculated about the possibility of the ogre being the depiction of a Jew as an expression of blood libel against Jews. Another theory is that the statue is the likeness of Krampus, the beast-like creature from the folklore of Alpine countries thought to punish children during the Christmas season who had misbehaved. According to other theories it is a depiction of the Greek titan Cronus eating his children or the Roman Saturn eating the months, though Cronus should have six and Saturn twelve rather than the sculpture's eight.

Another theory is that it represented Cardinal Schiner who led the Swiss Confederation into several bloody defeats in Northern Italy. An alternative theory is that it is a depiction of the older brother of Duke Berchtold (founder of Bern) who it is claimed, was so incensed by his younger brother's overshadowing of him that he collected and ate the town's children. Such an incident is not recorded in Bern's history books. A final theory is that it is just a carnival character intended to frighten disobedient children.

Another theory is the eight children depict the eight cantons of the Old Swiss Confederacy and the Ogre is an enemy (possibly Charles the Bold, Duke of Burgundy) trying to gobble the cantons up. This would match with the fountain's base which shows a frieze of armed bears going to war, including a piper and a drummer. The frieze may have been designed by Hans Rudolf Manuel Deutsch.

The Kindlifresserbrunnen is an important object in the 1973 novel L'Ogre (The Ogre) by Jacques Chessex.
