= Gerechtigkeitsgasse =

Street in Bern, Switzerland

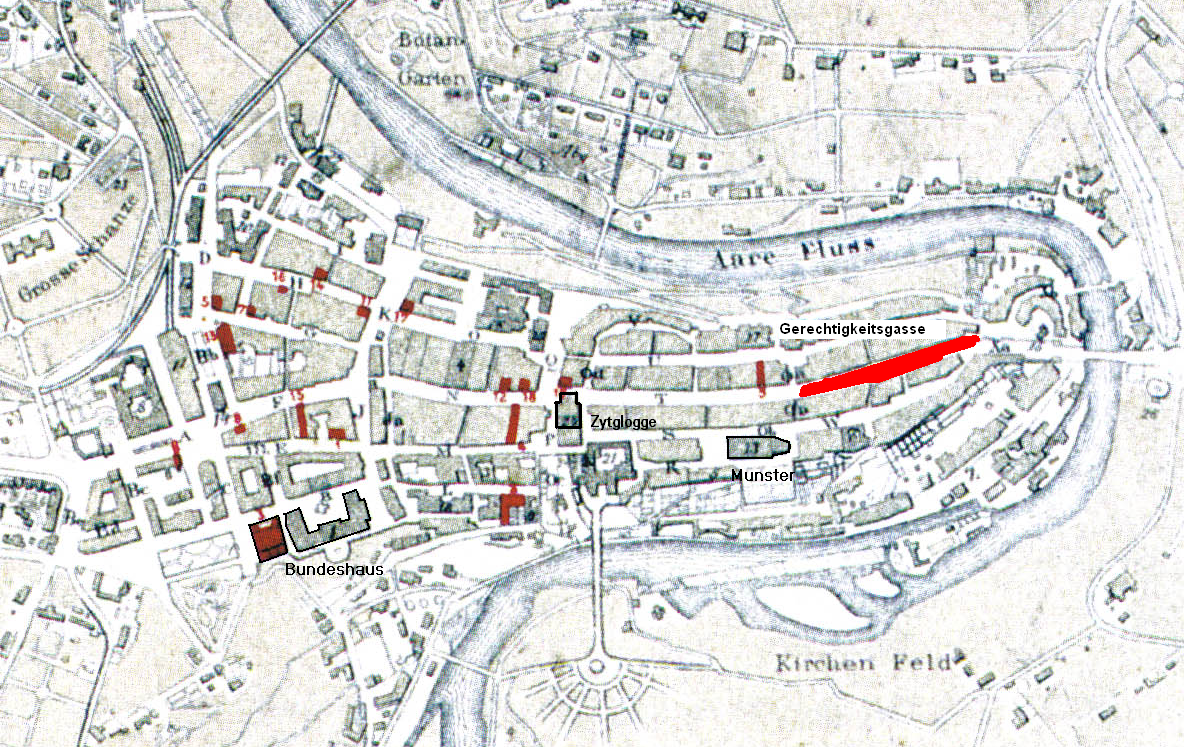
- Old City of Bern with Gerechtigkeitsgasse highlighted
- Interactive map of Gerechtigkeitsgasse
- Former names: Märitgasse by der Gerechtigkeit
- Length: 260 m (850 ft)
- Location: Old City of Bern, Bern, Switzerland
- Postal code: 3011
- Coordinates: 46.948377°N 7.454525°E

Construction
- Construction start: 1191

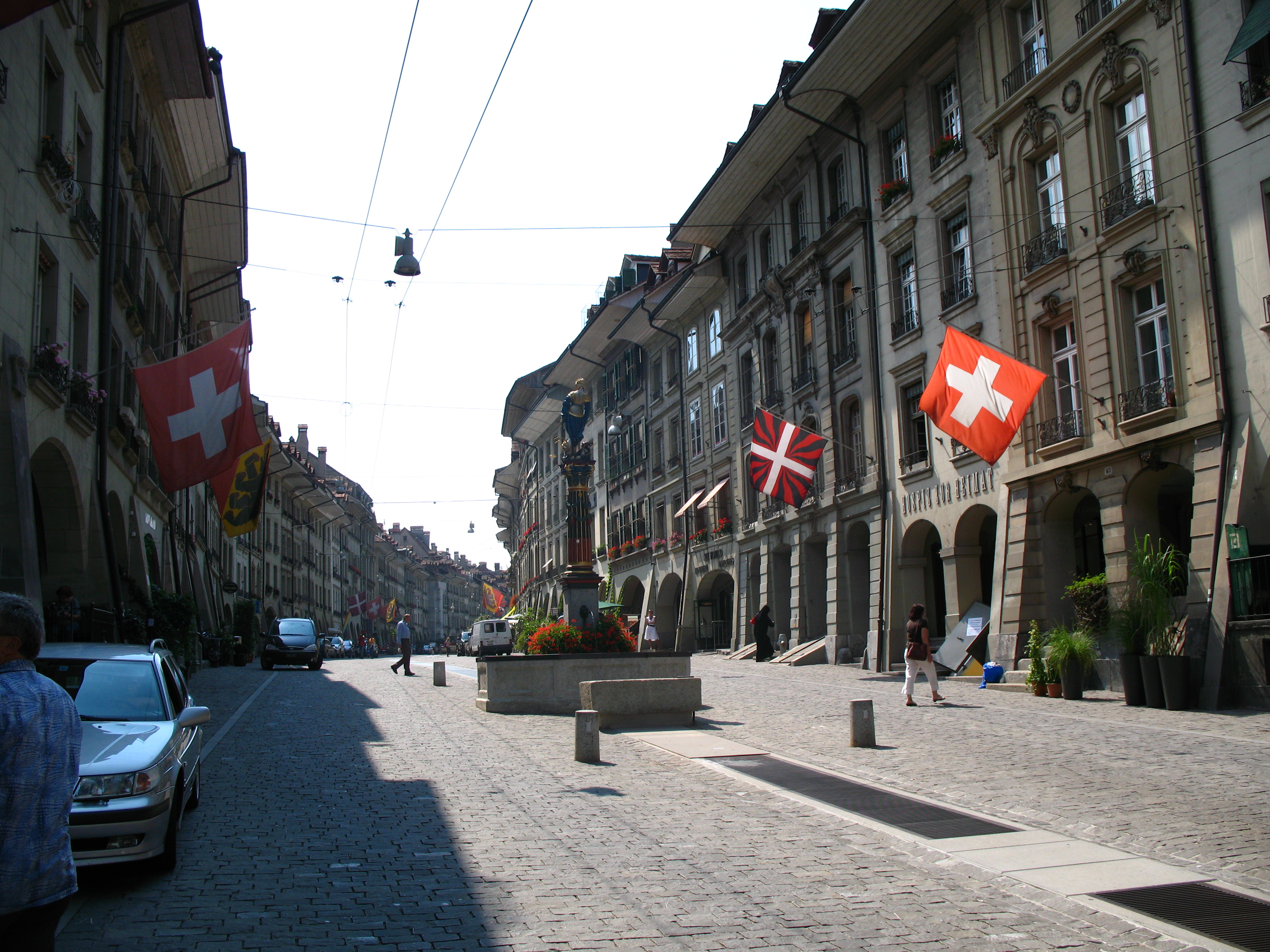
The eastern half of the Gerechtigkeitsgasse, looking toward the Gerechtigkeitsbrunnen and the Kramgasse

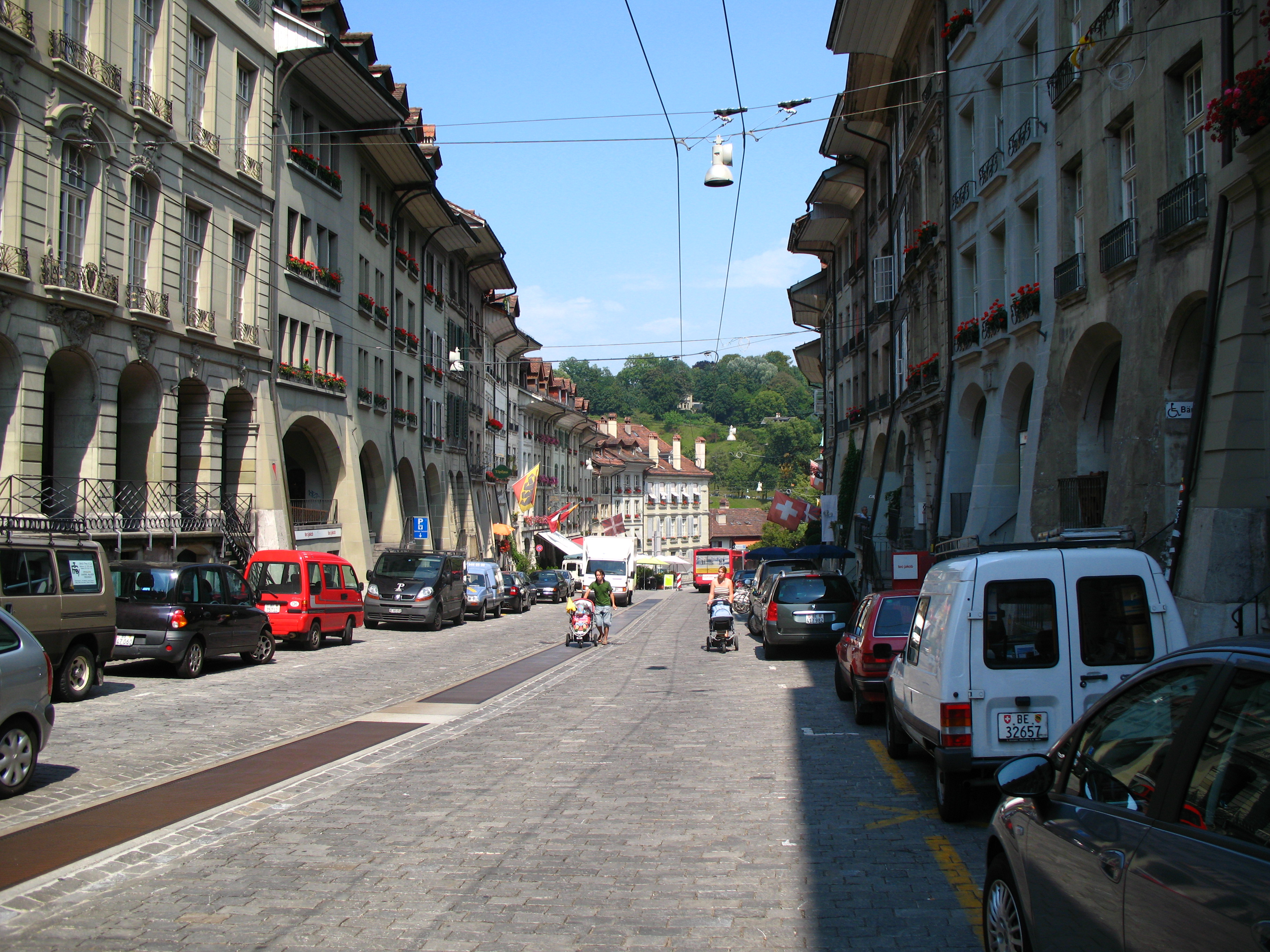
Looking down toward the Nydeggstalden

The Gerechtigkeitsgasse ("Justice Alley") is one of the principal streets in the Old City of Bern, the medieval city center of Bern, Switzerland. Together with its extension, the Kramgasse, it is the heart of the inner city. Hans Gieng's most famous fountain figure, the statue of Lady Justice on the Gerechtigkeitsbrunnen, commands the view of the street's gentle slopes and curves.

The Gerechtigkeitsgasse and its buildings are a heritage site of national significance and part of the UNESCO Cultural World Heritage Site that encompasses the Old City.

== Topography ==
The Gerechtigkeitsgasse is 260 meters (850 ft) long. It is the eastern half and the oldest part of the central East-West axis of the city's oldest neighbourhood, the Zähringerstadt, built right after the founding of the city in 1191. It continues to the west as the Kramgasse after being crossed by the Kreuzgasse. In the west, the Gerechtigkeitsgasse bifurcates as it enters the Nydegg neighbourhood: the Nydeggstalden leads to the Untertorbrücke, and the Nydeggasse to the more recent Nydeggbrücke. Several narrow alleys and passageways connect the Kramgasse to the parallel Postgasse in the north and the Junkerngasse in the south.

The Gerechtigkeitsgasse cannot be reached by car without a special permit. It is accessible by foot or bike or by means of the Bernmobil bus line no. 12 that runs through it and stops at either end of the street (Rathaus and Nydegg). Both sides of the street are covered with Lauben, stone arcades that protect pedestrians from inclement weather.

== History ==
The Gerechtigkeitsgasse was the main street of the town at the time of its founding. With its original width of around 26 meters (85 ft), reduced to 18 meters (59 ft) after the construction of the arcades, it also served as the central marketplace of medieval Bern. For this reason, the Gerechtigkeitsgasse and the Kramgasse together were called the Märitgasse (Swiss German for "Market Alley") until the 16th century. After that time, the markets moved west towards the Zytglogge, and the street came to be called by der Gerechtigkeit ("near [Lady] Justice"), in reference to the fountain installed in 1543. Only in 1798 was the street officially renamed Gerechtigkeitsgasse. The meat and bread stalls, the tannery and most guilds also moved out of the street between 1450 and 1550 as it gradually became a residential area mainly for the ruling noble families. The urban tribunal with its pillory and judge's chair made of stone remained located in the street near the Kreuzgasse significantly longer.

On the eastern end, the streetscape was altered by the slighting of Nydegg Castle in 1270, the demolition of other fortifications until 1405 and several excavations of the roadbed until 1764 to reduce the street's downward slope. In 2005, the street was thoroughly renovated and its cobblestone pavement replaced. The city ditch (Stadtbach) running through the middle of the street since medieval times is now visible again through metal gratings.

== Buildings ==
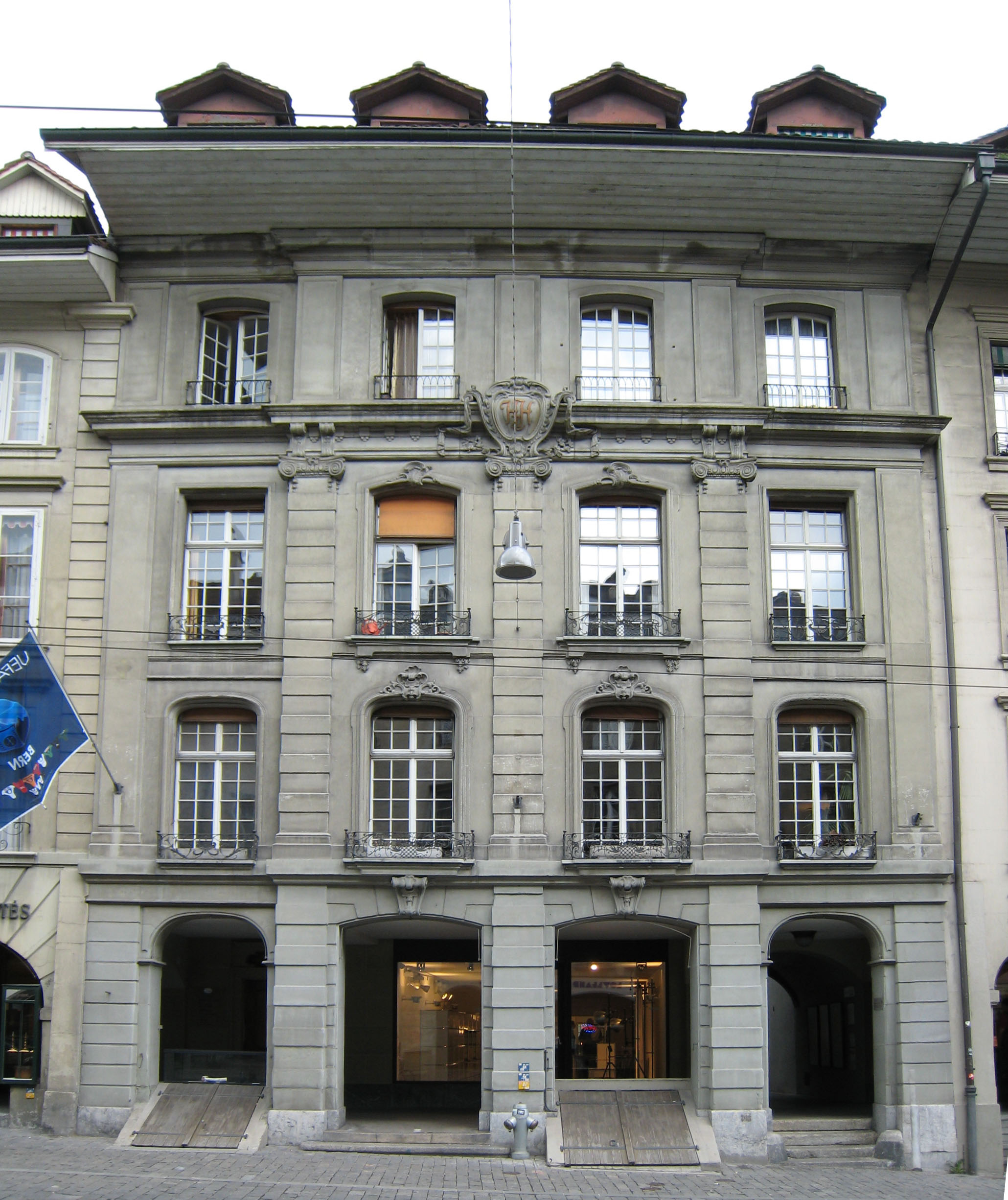
No. 52

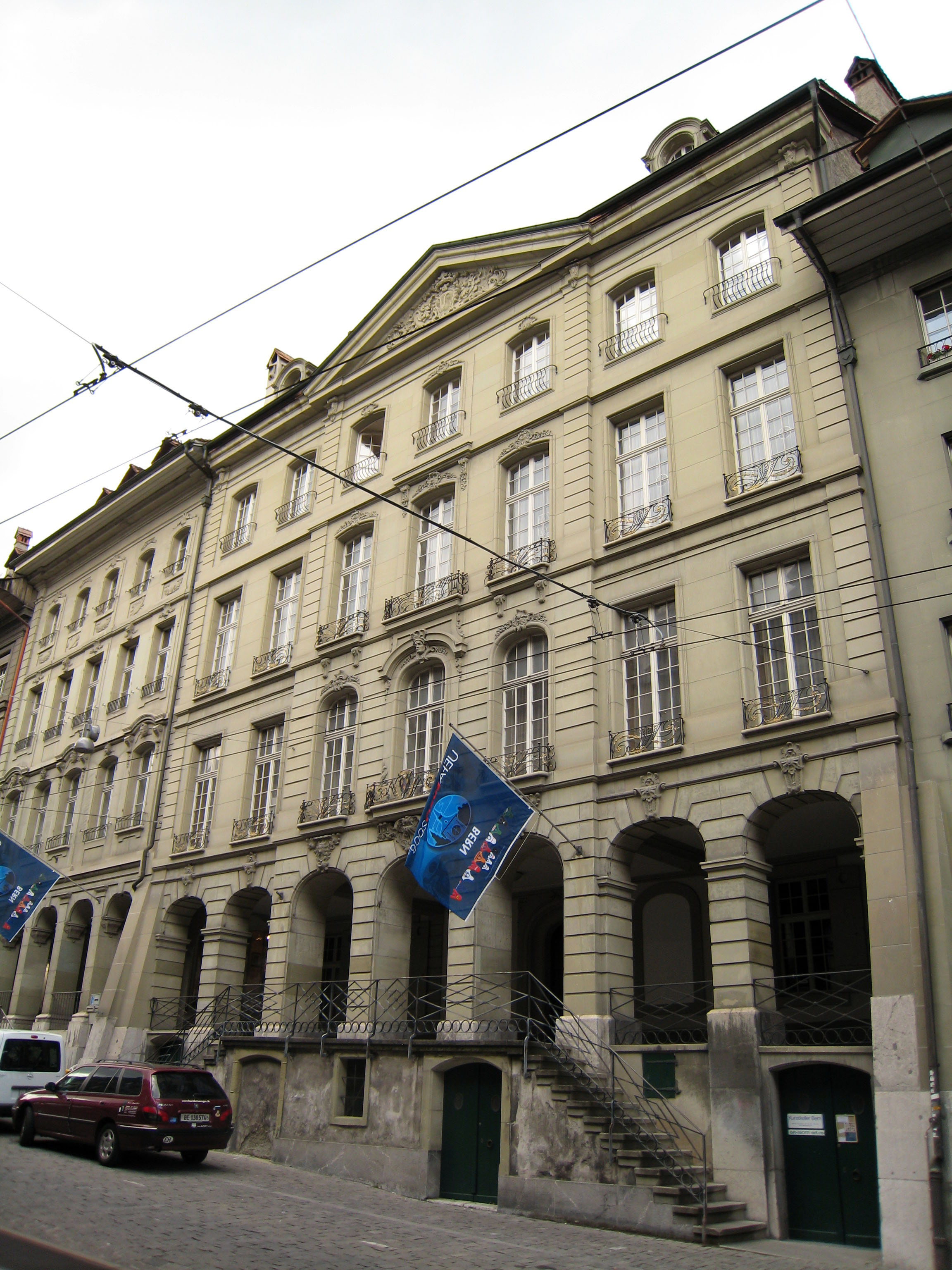
No. 40; the floor of the arcades is at the level of the original roadbed.

The architectural history of the Gerechtigkeitsgasse is mostly not recorded until 1600. The oldest dated house is no. 60, built in 1531 by Hans Franz Nägeli. Roughly half the buildings bear the imprint of the late 16th century. Renaissance architecture and the early Baroque touched the outside of the buildings only lightly. As in the Kramgasse, two thirds of the houses received new façades until 1780, reshaping most of the eastern and central part of the street in the image of the late Baroque. Unlike other streets, no substantial changes were made to the streetscape since; a project to demolish five houses in 1954 was prevented by exceptionally broad public opposition, receiving international support.

House no. 7, the Goldener Adler ("Golden Eagle"), is Bern's oldest hostel and tavern. It was first recorded in 1489 as Weisses Kreuz; the building is a 1764 construction by N. Hebler. The eagle head holding the inn sign is one of the chief works of this type in Switzerland. No. 40 is Bern's most expansive urban palais; it is exemplary for the insertion of a French hôtel in the medieval cityscape. It was built in 1743 by Albrecht Stürler for Alexander von Wattenwyl and was the site of the surrender of the Helvetic government to French troops on 18 September 1802. No. 42 is the first certain work of Stürler, who was 28 years old when designing it in 1734 for Niklaus Jenner.

House no. 33 is significant as a principal work of Bernese manierism with one of the best Régence façades and Louis XV interior. It was built in 1608 by Andres Widmer and the exterior was reshaped by Türler in 1740. No. 52, built 1730, is considered to be Niklaus Sprüngli's best town house. No. 56, a rather simple 1730 Régence house, is noted for its exceptional door knocker. No. 62 houses the Klötzlikeller restaurant. Established in 1632, it is the last of originally more than 200 cellar taverns of Bern. No. 79, the Gesellschaftshaus zum Distelzwang, built in 1703 by Samuel Jenner, is a principal work of early Baroque architecture in Bern.

== Bibliography ==
- Caviezel, Zita; Herzog, Georges; Keller, Jürg A. (2006), Basel-Landschaft, Basel-Stadt, Bern, Solothurn, Kunstführer durch die Schweiz, vol. 3 (1st ed.), Bern: Gesellschaft für Schweizerische Kunstgeschichte, pp. 188 et seq., ISBN 3-906131-97-1
- Limbach, Fridolin (1978), Die schöne Stadt Bern: die bewegte Geschichte der alten "Märit-" oder "Meritgasse", der heutigen Gerechtigkeits- und Kramgasse und der alten Zähringerstadt Bern, Bern: Benteli, ISBN 3-7165-0273-1
- Hofer, Paul (1952), Die Stadt Bern, Kunstdenkmäler des Kantons Bern, vol. 1, Basel: Gesellschaft für Schweizerische Kunstgeschichte / Verlag Birkhäuser, pp. 242 et seq., ISBN 3-906131-13-0, archived from the original on 7 July 2011
