= Paul Schenk =

- Born: February 11, 1899; Leipzig, German Empire
- Died: August 30, 1977 (aged 78); Leipzig, Eastern Germany/GDR
- Occupation: Music theorist

Paul (Edmund) Schenk (11 February 1899 – 30 August 1977) was a German music theorist.

== Life ==
Born in Leipzig, Schenk studied theory, composition and conducting at the University of Music and Theatre Leipzig, where he also received a teaching position for music theory from 1925. His studies with Sigfrid Karg-Elert, whose music theory Schenk accepted and propagated, were formative.

Immediately after their first electoral successes, Schenk joined the NSDAP and in his textbooks covered all the essential aspects of a "völkischen" music education.

In 1949 he was appointed professor for composition and ear training and headed the department of composition (music theory) at the Leipzig Academy of Music until his retirement in 1964. Schenk had a decisive influence on a whole generation of music theorists of the GDR.

Schenk died in his native town at the age of 78.

== Writings ==
- Sigfrid Karg-Elert: eine monographische Skizze mit vollständigem Werkverzeichnis. Leipzig 1927
- Lehrbuch der polaren Harmonik, Leipzig 1927
- Gehörbildungslehre. 8 issues, Trossingen 1951
- Schule des Blattsingens. Leipzig 1953
- Funktioneller Tonsatz. Arbeiten am Klavier. 2 vols., Leipzig 1953
- Allgemeine Musiklehre. Ergänzungs- und Fortbildungsband zu Hofmeisters Schulwerken für Musikinstrumente. Leipzig 1956
- Kleine praktische Harmonielehre. Leipzig 1976

== Literature ==
- Ludwig Holtmeier: Paul Schenk. In Ludwig Finscher (ed.): Die Musik in Geschichte und Gegenwart. Volume 14, Kassel 2005
