= Hans Gieng =

Swiss sculptor active in the 16th century

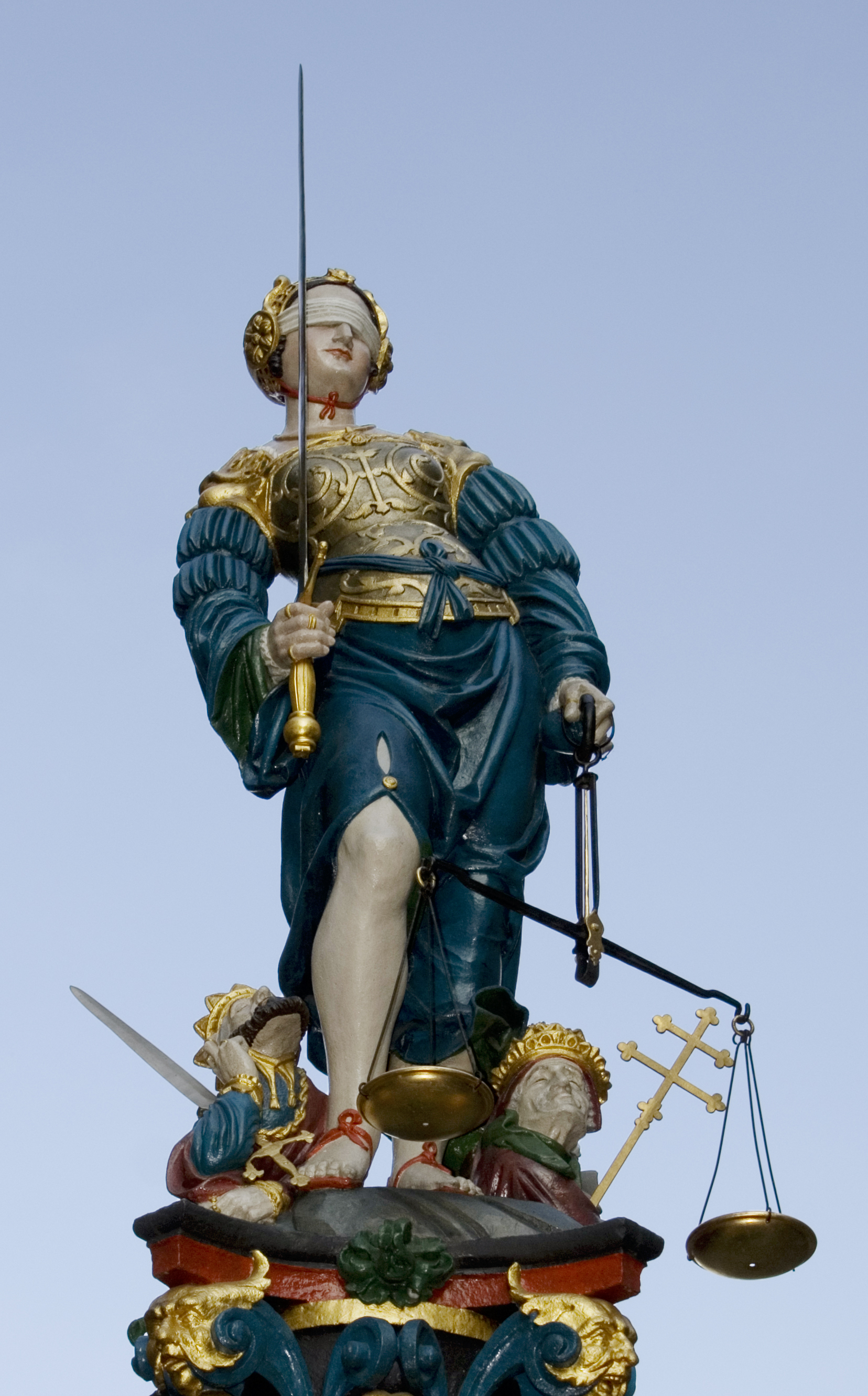
The iconic Lady Justice on the Gerechtigkeitsbrunnen in Bern, ruling over and revered by secular and spiritual authority (represented by the Emperor and Pope) is one of the best-known works attributed to Hans Gieng.

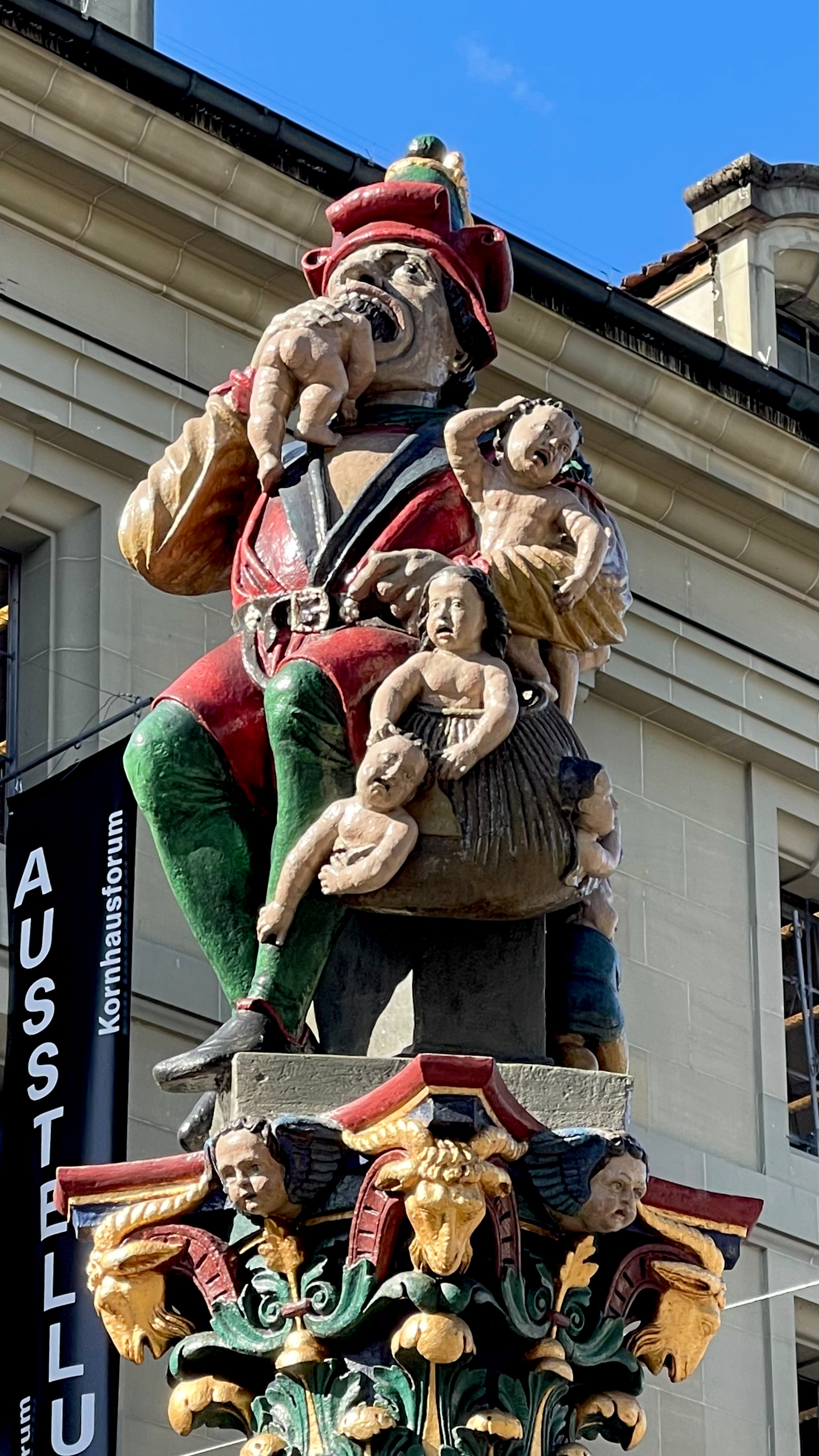
The Kindlifresserbrunnen in Bern, which represents an ogre eating children -- hence the literal translation of the name as "Child Eater Fountain"

Hans Gieng (first mentioned 1525 – died 1562) was a Swiss Renaissance sculptor best known for his public fountain figures in the Old Town of Bern as well as Fribourg.

== Biography ==
Gieng, who was probably of Swabian origin, is recorded to have become a citizen of Fribourg and a member of the traders' guild in 1527. He likely first worked in the sculpture workshop of Hans Geiler, whom he succeeded in 1533. In earlier centuries, Geiler and Gieng were sometimes confused with one another, but modern research indicates that they were actually two distinct persons.

As a sculptor, Gieng was mainly active in Fribourg. He also worked in Bern in the 1540s, in Solothurn from 1554 to 1556, and in 1557 in St. Gallen.

== Works ==
Gieng's style is close to Swabian art: traditional and still in the style of Gothic art in his religious creations, but forceful and realistic in the secular works.

=== Freiburg ===
In Freiburg, the Renaissance council table (1546) and the figures of the seven public fountains (1547–60), considered the most significant ensemble of sculptural art from this period in Switzerland, are among his principal works.

=== Bern ===
Gieng created several if not most of the public fountains of Bern that were put up between 1542 and 1546. His presence in the city is sparsely attested in the surviving record: a 1543 Council diary entry reports a “Meyster Hans, Bildhower, im grossen Spital z'Herbrig sin und an des spittelmeisters tisch ässen” (“Master Hans, sculptor, residing in the great Hospital and eating at the Spitalmaster's table”).

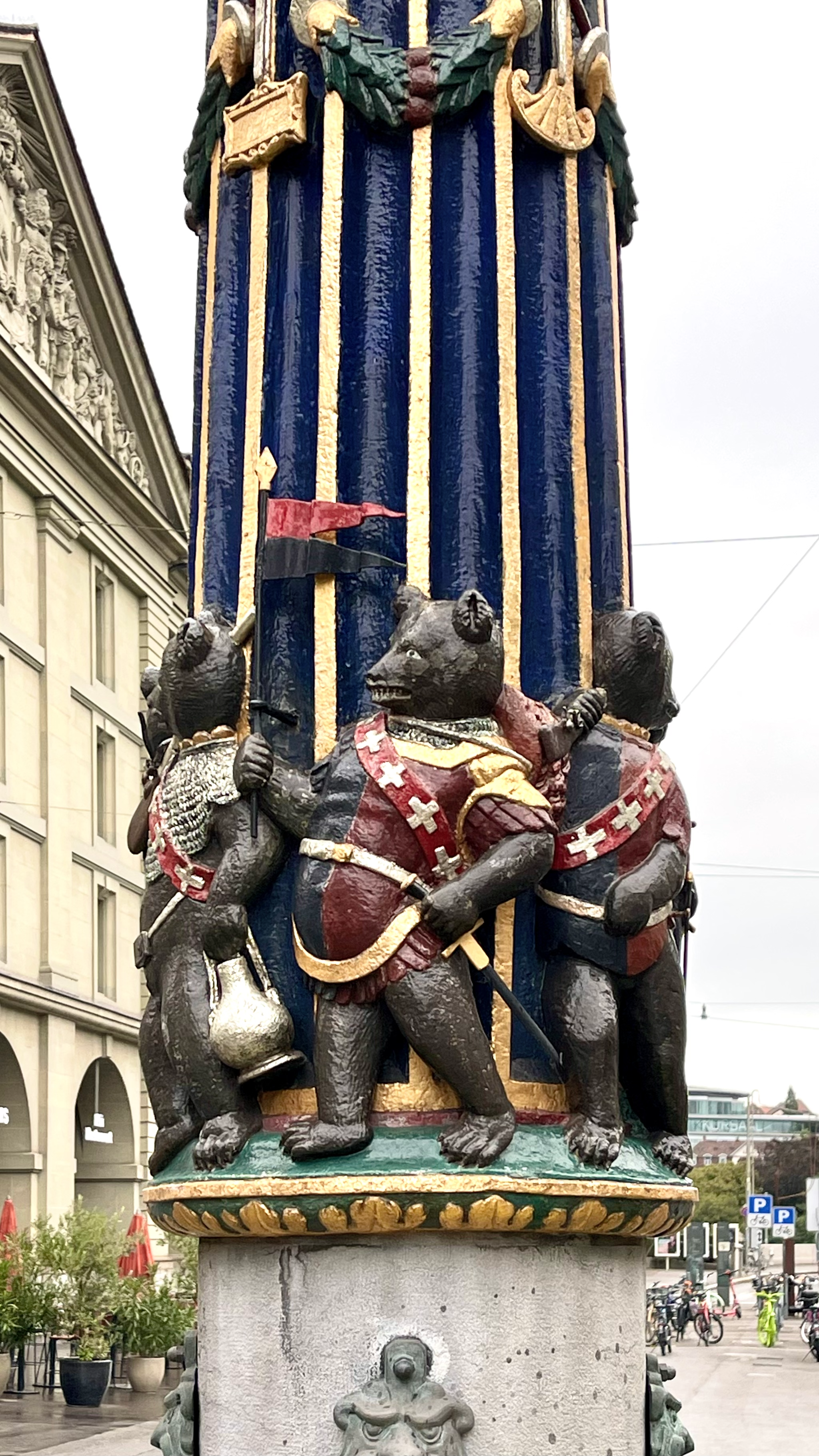

For this reason, his authorship of the individual fountain figures, which are unsigned, has long been a matter of dispute. Paul Schenk's seminal work of 1945, Berner Brunnen-Chronik (Bernese Fountain Chronicle) attributes three fountains to Gieng with certainty—the Pfeiferbrunnen (piper fountain), the Kindlifresserbrunnen (ogre fountain) and the Simsonbrunnen (Samson fountain)—while considering it "quite possible" that Gieng also created the other wells. Later works such as Paul Hofer's Kunstdenkmäler des Kantons Bern of 1952 or Berchtold Weber's Historisch-topographisches Lexikon der Stadt Bern of 1976 are virtually certain of Gieng's authorship of most Bernese fountains.

=== Other works ===
Other works attributed to Gieng include monumental crucifixes, stonework in the church of Tafers, statues, tombstones, and heraldic motifs.

== See also ==
- Old Town of Berne
