= Neuengasse =

Street in Bern, Switzerland

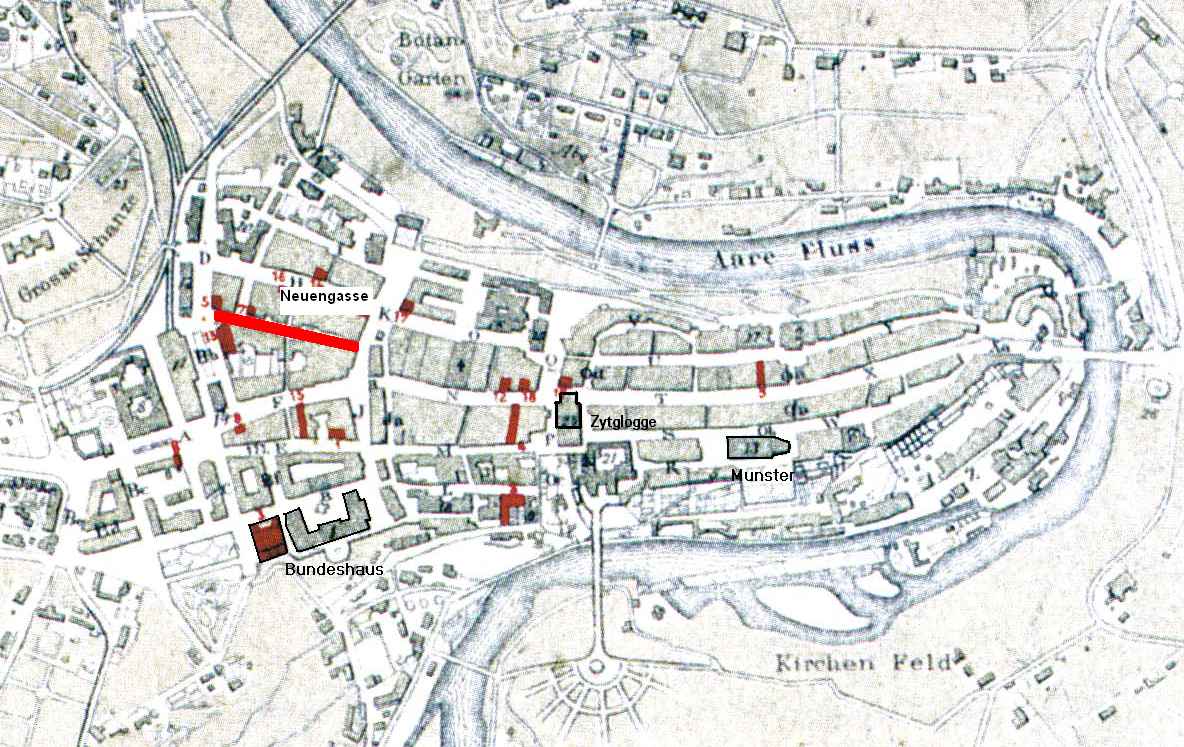
- Old City of Bern with Neuengasse highlighted
- Length: 200 m (660 ft)
- Location: Old City of Bern, Bern, Switzerland
- Postal code: 3011
- Coordinates: 46°56′55.49″N 7°26′36.5″E

The Neuengasse is one of the streets in the Old City of Bern, the medieval city center of Bern, Switzerland. It is part of the Äussere Neustadt which was built during the third expansion of the city in 1344 to 1346. It runs from Waisenhausplatz in the east toward the main train station. It is part of the UNESCO Cultural World Heritage Site that encompasses the Old City.

== History ==
The street has been known as Neuengasse since its construction in the 14th century when the 3rd city wall was built. The name Neuengasse means New Lane.
