= Bubenbergplatz =

Plaza in the Old City of Bern

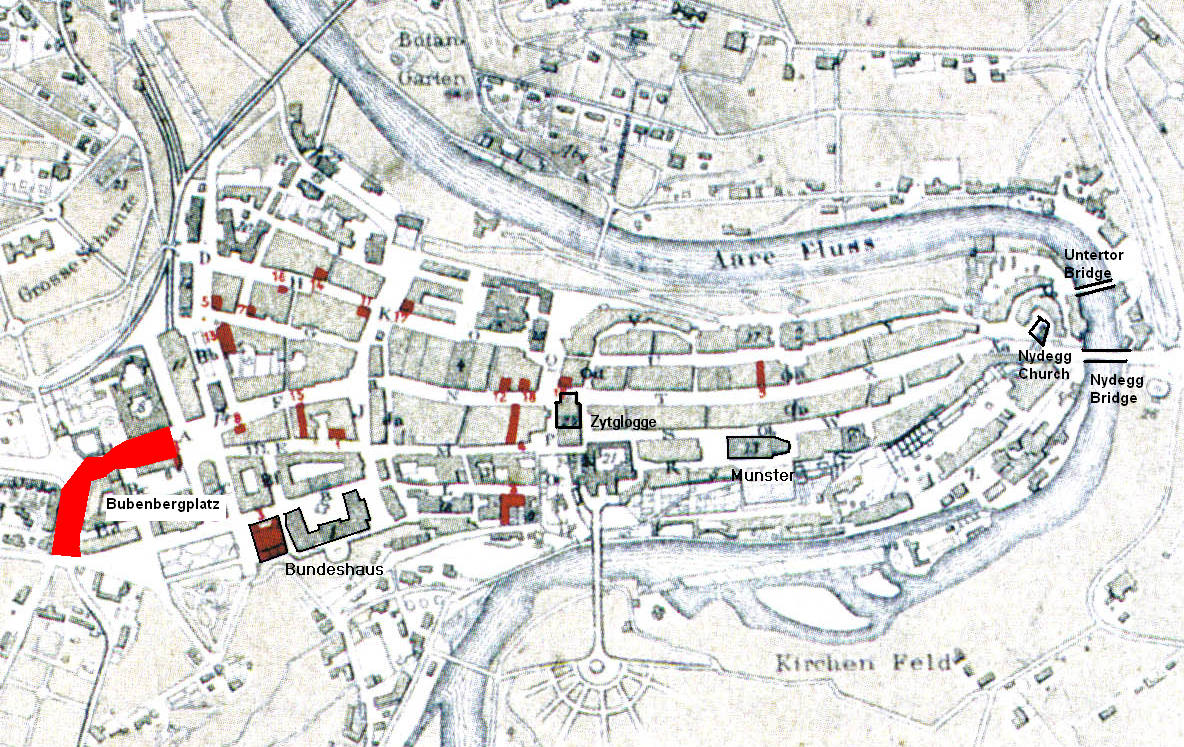
- Old City of Bern with Bubenbergplatz highlighted
- Location: Old City of Bern, Bern, Switzerland
- Postal code: 3011
- Coordinates: 46°56′50.58″N 7°26′20.67″E

The Bubenbergplatz (Bubenberg Plaza, named after Adrian von Bubenberg) is a plaza in the Old City of Bern, the medieval city center of Bern, Switzerland. It is part of the area outside the third city walls. It is located south-west of Bahnhofplatz and is part of the UNESCO Cultural World Heritage Site that encompasses the Old City.

== History ==
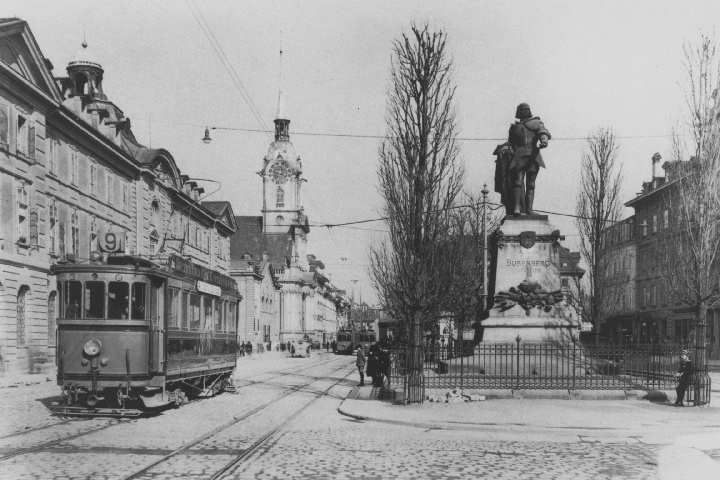
Bubenbergplatz around 1915, before the fountain and statue were moved

Since the construction of the Obertor in 1625/26, the area between the Obertor and the Christoffelturm was known as Zwischen den Toren (between the gates). From 1858 until 1898 the plaza was known as Christoffelplatz. Then, in 1898 it was renamed after Adrian von Bubenberg, the mayor (Schultheiss) of Bern in 1468-1469, 1473–1474 and 1477–1479 and the hero of Battle of Murten. The Bubenberg memorial and fountain was built by Max Leu in 1897 and originally stood at the entrance to Bubenbergplatz. In 1930 the plaza was rebuilt with a new tram station and the memorial was moved to the west. The new location of the fountain and memorial was at the entrance of Hirschengraben road with the statue facing north.

In 1971/76 an underground walkway was added to Bubenbergplatz and the roads and trams routes were slightly changed.
