= List of cultural property of national significance in Switzerland: Bern A-M =

This list contains about half of the cultural property of national significance (class A) in the canton of Bern from the 2009 Swiss Inventory of Cultural Property of National and Regional Significance. It is sorted by municipality and contains 345 individual buildings, 43 collections, 30 archaeological finds and 4 other, special sites or objects.

The geographic coordinates provided are in the Swiss coordinate system as given in the Inventory.

Contents: Top - A B C D E F G H I J K L M N through Z

== Aarberg ==
KGS No.^{?}	Picture	Name	Street Address	CH1903 X coordinate	CH1903 Y coordinate	Location
578	Covered Wooden Bridge	Covered Wooden Bridge	Stadtplatz / Murtenstrasse	587.520	210.300	47.043613°N 7.274416°E
9766	Liechti House	Liechti House	Murtenstrasse 6	587.379	210.295	47.043566°N 7.272561°E
Unknown	ISOS Kleinstadt / Flecken: Aarberg	ISOS Kleinstadt / Flecken: Aarberg				

== Aarwangen ==
KGS No.^{?}	Picture	Name	Street Address	CH1903 X coordinate	CH1903 Y coordinate	Location
9191	Speicher (Warehouse)	Speicher (Warehouse)	Meiniswilstrasse 66 B	622.800	231.180	47.23115°N 7.739709°E
587	Tierli House	Tierli House	Jurastrasse 3	625.004	232.188	47.240137°N 7.768868°E
Unknown		ISOS hamlet: Meiniswil				
Unknown	ISOS Spezialfall: Aarwangen Castle / Schürhof	ISOS Spezialfall: Aarwangen Castle / Schürhof				

== Aegerten ==
KGS No.^{?}	Picture	Name	Street Address	CH1903 X coordinate	CH1903 Y coordinate	Location
10483	Goldhubel, Early Medieval Earthen Fortress	Goldhubel, Early Medieval Earthen Fortress		587.800	218.480	47.117197°N 7.27788°E

== Allmendingen ==
KGS No.^{?}	Picture	Name	Street Address	CH1903 X coordinate	CH1903 Y coordinate	Location
591	Noble's Manor House, Alter Sandacker	Noble's Manor House, Alter Sandacker	Sandacherweg 12	606.702	196.064	46.915642°N 7.526617°E
11714	Villa	Villa	Bergliweg 11	605.944	195.651	46.911934°N 7.516661°E

== Amsoldingen ==
KGS No.^{?}	Picture	Name	Street Address	CH1903 X coordinate	CH1903 Y coordinate	Location
594	Former Collegiate Church of St. Mauritius and Amsoldingen Castle	Former Collegiate Church of St. Mauritius and Amsoldingen Castle	Chorherrengasse 4	610.719	175.119	46.727182°N 7.578859°E

== Arni ==
KGS No.^{?}	Picture	Name	Street Address	CH1903 X coordinate	CH1903 Y coordinate	Location
Unknown		ISOS hamlet: Hämlismatt				

== Attiswil ==
KGS No.^{?}	Picture	Name	Street Address	CH1903 X coordinate	CH1903 Y coordinate	Location
Unknown		ISOS Village: Attiswil				

== Bätterkinden ==
KGS No.^{?}	Picture	Name	Street Address	CH1903 X coordinate	CH1903 Y coordinate	Location
9192	Farm House	Farm House	Solothurnstrasse 39	607.434	220.800	47.138136°N 7.536632°E
598	Village Church	Village Church	Bernstrasse 15	607.720	219.790	47.129048°N 7.540385°E

== Belp ==
KGS No.^{?}	Picture	Name	Street Address	CH1903 X coordinate	CH1903 Y coordinate	Location
9065	Bider-Hangar	Bider-Hangar	Flugplatz 936 / Flugplatzstrasse 47	604.786	195.858	46.913806°N 7.501463°E
605	Oberried Estate with Associated Buildings	Oberried Estate with Associated Buildings	Seftigenstrasse 118, 120	604.269	193.065	46.888685°N 7.49465°E

== Bern ==
KGS No.^{?}	Picture	Name	Street Address	CH1903 X coordinate	CH1903 Y coordinate	Location
666	Altenbergsteg	Altenbergsteg		600.750	199.900	46.950181°N 7.448489°E
9554	Old City of Bern	Old City of Bern		600.660	199.650	46.947932°N 7.447307°E
611	Anna-Seiler-Brunnen Fountain	Anna-Seiler-Brunnen Fountain	Marktgasse	600.448	199.678	46.948185°N 7.444522°E
612	Bärengraben	Bärengraben	Grosser Muristalden 4	601.598	199.660	46.948021°N 7.459627°E
8559	Bernische Stiftung für angewandte Kunst and Gestaltung	Bernische Stiftung für angewandte Kunst and Gestaltung	Morillonstrasse 87	599.790	197.806	46.931346°N 7.43588°E
9296	Bibliothek am Guisanplatz (Former Confederation Military Library)	Bibliothek am Guisanplatz (Former Confederation Military Library)	Papiermühlestrasse 21 a	601.858	200.910	46.959264°N 7.463048°E
8571	Botanical Garden of the Universität Bern	Botanical Garden of the Universität Bern	Altenbergrain 21	600.520	200.262	46.953438°N 7.445468°E
615	Bundeshaus	Bundeshaus	Bundesplatz / Bundesgasse 1–9	600.423	199.519	46.946754°N 7.444193°E
8470	Bundeskunstsammlung	Bundeskunstsammlung	Monbijoustrasse 51 A	599.807	198.966	46.94178°N 7.436102°E
616	Burgerhaus	Burgerhaus	Amthausgasse 5	600.591	199.572	46.947231°N 7.4464°E
617	Burgerspital	Burgerspital	Bubenbergplatz 4	600.060	199.620	46.947663°N 7.439425°E
8996	Casino	Casino	Herrengasse 25	600.766	199.547	46.947006°N 7.448699°E
679	Christ-Catholic Church of St. Peter and Paul	Christ-Catholic Church of St. Peter and Paul	Rathausgasse 2	601.000	199.730	46.948652°N 7.451773°E
681	Diesbach House	Diesbach House	Münstergasse 2	601.031	199.615	46.947617°N 7.45218°E
9013	Reitschule (Former Municipal School)	Reitschule (Former Municipal School)	Schützenmattstrasse 7	600.155	200.210	46.95297°N 7.440673°E
632	Former Kornhaus (Former Granary, now a Museum)	Former Kornhaus (Former Granary, now a Museum)	Kornhausplatz 18	600.659	199.747	46.948805°N 7.447294°E
683	Former Rathaus des Äusseren Standes (Council House of the Outer Territories)	Former Rathaus des Äusseren Standes (Council House of the Outer Territories)	Zeughausgasse 17	600.554	199.743	46.948769°N 7.445914°E
8984	Federal Alcohol Department Building	Federal Alcohol Department Building	Länggassstrasse 31	599.514	200.239	46.953231°N 7.432253°E
619	Eidgenössische Münzstätte (Federal Mint)	Eidgenössische Münzstätte (Federal Mint)	Bernastrasse 28	600.757	198.833	46.940583°N 7.448579°E
686	Federal Tariff Department Building	Federal Tariff Department Building	Monbijoustrasse 40	599.764	199.008	46.942158°N 7.435538°E
10468	Elfenau Park	Elfenau Park	Elfenauweg 91–94	602.047	197.951	46.932647°N 7.465518°E
620	Engehalbinsel Iron Age Oppidum / Roman Vicus	Engehalbinsel Iron Age Oppidum / Roman Vicus		600.840	203.615	46.983598°N 7.449678°E
621	Erlacherhof	Erlacherhof	Junkerngasse 47	601.146	199.588	46.947374°N 7.45369°E
9396	Felsenau Viadukt	Felsenau Viadukt	Autobahn A1	600.670	202.010	46.969161°N 7.447441°E
9193	Fischer’sche Post House	Fischer’sche Post House	Postgasse 64	601.129	199.745	46.948786°N 7.453467°E
10467	Garden of Villa Bomonti	Garden of Villa Bomonti	Kalcheggweg 12	601.997	198.679	46.939195°N 7.464864°E
691	Generaldirektion SBB-CFF-FFS (Head Offices of the Federal Railway)	Generaldirektion SBB-CFF-FFS (Head Offices of the Federal Railway)	Hochschulstrasse 6	599.872	199.891	46.950101°N 7.436956°E
622	Gerechtigkeitsbrunnen (fountain)	Gerechtigkeitsbrunnen (fountain)	Gerechtigkeitsgasse	601.172	199.685	46.948247°N 7.454032°E
11620	Gesellschaftshaus zu Pfistern	Gesellschaftshaus zu Pfistern	Kramgasse 9	600.996	199.640	46.947842°N 7.45172°E
623	Gewerbeschule	Gewerbeschule	Lorrainestrasse 1	600.476	200.407	46.954742°N 7.44489°E
693	Halenbrücke (bridge) (shared with Kirchlindach)	Halenbrücke (bridge) (shared with Kirchlindach)	Halenstrasse	598.450	202.280	46.971588°N 7.418269°E
624	Hauptwache	Hauptwache	Theaterplatz 13	600.669	199.570	46.947213°N 7.447425°E
696	House	House	Bim Zytglogge 1	600.710	199.642	46.94786°N 7.447963°E
9113	House	House	Gerechtigkeitsgasse 33	601.192	199.679	46.948193°N 7.454295°E
694	House	House	Gerechtigkeitsgasse 40	601.213	199.715	46.948516°N 7.454571°E
695	House	House	Gerechtigkeitsgasse 42	601.199	199.711	46.94848°N 7.454387°E
9194	House	House	Gerechtigkeitsgasse 44	601.189	199.708	46.948453°N 7.454255°E
9195	House	House	Gerechtigkeitsgasse 52	601.160	199.701	46.948391°N 7.453874°E
11785	House	House	Gerechtigkeitsgasse 81	601.052	199.646	46.947896°N 7.452456°E
9120	House	House	Herrengasse 4	600.889	199.556	46.947087°N 7.450314°E
742	House	House	Herrengasse 23	600.822	199.543	46.94697°N 7.449434°E
11716	House	House	Junkerngasse 32	601.150	199.666	46.948076°N 7.453743°E
9119	House	House	Junkerngasse 39	601.196	199.626	46.947716°N 7.454347°E
9109	House	House	Kramgasse 7	601.006	199.640	46.947842°N 7.451851°E
9122	House	House	Münstergasse 26	600.934	199.639	46.947833°N 7.450906°E
9110	House	House	Münstergasse 30	600.925	199.608	46.947554°N 7.450787°E
9145	Houses	Houses	Spitalgasse 36	600.220	199.662	46.948041°N 7.441527°E
8840	Historic Archive and Library PTT	Historic Archive and Library PTT	Viktoriastrasse 21	601.445	200.256	46.953382°N 7.45762°E
8508	Historisches Museum	Historisches Museum	Helvetiaplatz 5	600.811	199.105	46.94303°N 7.449289°E
9166	Hochschule der Künste (Liberal Arts University) Archive and Musical Collection	Hochschule der Künste (Liberal Arts University); Archive and Musical Collection	Papiermühlestrasse 13	601.596	200.506	46.955631°N 7.459604°E
628	Hôtel de Musique (Café du Théâtre)	Hôtel de Musique (Café du Théâtre)	Theaterplatz 7	600.683	199.604	46.947519°N 7.447609°E
629	Käfigturm	Käfigturm		600.400	199.684	46.948239°N 7.443891°E
630	Kantonale Militäranstalten (Cantonal Military Institute)	Kantonale Militäranstalten (Cantonal Military Institute)	Papiermühlestrasse 15	601.544	200.666	46.95707°N 7.458922°E
699	Catholic Church of Bruder Klaus	Catholic Church of Bruder Klaus	Ostring 1	602.110	199.040	46.942442°N 7.46635°E
700	KA-WE-DE (Open Air Swimming Pool)	KA-WE-DE (Open Air Swimming Pool)	Jubiläumsstrasse 101	600.642	198.246	46.935303°N 7.447068°E
631	Kindlifresserbrunnen (fountain)	Kindlifresserbrunnen (fountain)	Kornhausplatz	600.667	199.696	46.948346°N 7.447399°E
9118	Kirchberger House	Kirchberger House	Kramgasse 61	600.816	199.639	46.947833°N 7.449356°E
701	Kirchenfeldbrücke (bridge)	Kirchenfeldbrücke (bridge)	Casinoplatz /	600.765	199.360	46.945324°N 7.448685°E
702	Kornhausbrücke (bridge)	Kornhausbrücke (bridge)	Kornhausstrasse	600.760	199.990	46.950991°N 7.448621°E
633	Kreuzgassbrunnen (fountain)	Kreuzgassbrunnen (fountain)	Kramgasse	601.016	199.656	46.947986°N 7.451983°E
634	Kunstmuseum und Kunsthistorisches Seminar (Art Museum and Art History Center of Bern)	Kunstmuseum und Kunsthistorisches Seminar (Art Museum and Art History Center of Bern)	Hodlerstrasse 12	600.338	200.022	46.951279°N 7.443077°E
635	Läuferbrunnen (fountain)	Läuferbrunnen (fountain)	Läuferplatz	601.451	199.829	46.949541°N 7.457697°E
8488	Lichtspiel-Kinemathek	Lichtspiel-Kinemathek	Bahnstrasse 21	598.189	199.702	46.948398°N 7.414849°E
712	Loryspital	Loryspital	Freiburgstrasse 41 G	598.684	199.360	46.945323°N 7.421352°E
636	Mosesbrunnen (fountain)	Mosesbrunnen (fountain)	Münsterplatz	600.905	199.587	46.947365°N 7.450525°E
9196	Münster (Cathedral) Platform	Münster (Cathedral) Platform	Münstergasse / Plattform	601.000	199.530	46.946853°N 7.451772°E
8510	Museum für Kommunikation	Museum für Kommunikation	Helvetiastrasse 16	600.899	198.970	46.941815°N 7.450445°E
8541	Naturhistorisches Museum der Burgergemeinde Bern	Naturhistorisches Museum der Burgergemeinde Bern	Bernastrasse 15	600.773	199.002	46.942103°N 7.44879°E
638	Neubrügg (bridge) (shared with Kirchlindach)	Neubrügg (bridge) (shared with Kirchlindach)	Neubrückstrasse / Stuckishausstrasse	599.200	202.520	46.973748°N 7.428124°E
716	Nydeggbrücke (bridge)	Nydeggbrücke (bridge)		601.540	199.705	46.948426°N 7.458866°E
639	Oberes Mayhaus (Erkerhaus)	Oberes Mayhaus (Erkerhaus)	Münstergasse 62	600.788	199.607	46.947546°N 7.448988°E
640	Pfeiferbrunnen (fountain)	Pfeiferbrunnen (fountain)	Spitalgasse	600.279	199.660	46.948023°N 7.442302°E
9015	Primarschule Stapfenacker (Primary School of Stapfenacker)	Primarschule Stapfenacker (Primary School of Stapfenacker)	Brünnenstrasse 40	595.822	199.267	46.944474°N 7.383761°E
645	Rathaus (Town council house) with City-State's Kanzlei	Rathaus (Town council house) with City-State's Kanzlei	Rathausplatz 2	601.043	199.728	46.948634°N 7.452338°E
641	Swiss Reformed Französische Church	Swiss Reformed Französische Church	Nägeligasse 1 A / Predigergasse 1	600.597	199.791	46.949201°N 7.446479°E
642	Swiss Reformed Heiliggeist Church	Swiss Reformed Heiliggeist Church	Spitalgasse 44	600.164	199.643	46.94787°N 7.440791°E
720	Swiss Reformed Paulus Church	Swiss Reformed Paulus Church	Freiestrasse 8	599.357	200.198	46.952862°N 7.43019°E
643	Münster (Cathedral)	Münster (Cathedral)	Münstergasse 7	600.979	199.588	46.947374°N 7.451497°E
646	Ryfflibrunnen (Fountain)	Ryfflibrunnen (Fountain)	Aarbergergasse	600.299	199.832	46.94957°N 7.442565°E
8894	Historic collection of the SBB-CFF-FFS	Historic collection of the SBB-CFF-FFS	Bollwerk 12	600.137	199.978	46.950883°N 7.440437°E
647	Wittigkofen Castle	Wittigkofen Castle	Melchenbühlweg 137	603.296	199.047	46.942501°N 7.481927°E
721	Holligen Castle	Holligen Castle	Holligenstrasse 44	598.473	199.161	46.943532°N 7.418581°E
648	Schützenbrunnen (fountain)	Schützenbrunnen (fountain)	Marktgasse	600.586	199.650	46.947933°N 7.446335°E
715	Schweizerische Nationalbank Swiss National Bank	Schweizerische Nationalbank; Swiss National Bank	Bundesplatz 1	600.480	199.570	46.947213°N 7.444942°E
649	Schweizerische Nationalbibliothek Swiss National Library	Schweizerische Nationalbibliothek; Swiss National Library	Hallwylstrasse 15	600.786	198.896	46.94115°N 7.44896°E
650	Schweizerische Theatersammlung	Schweizerische Theatersammlung	Schanzenstrasse 15	599.838	199.772	46.94903°N 7.436509°E
8821	Schweizerischer Gewerkschaftsband (SGB)	Schweizerischer Gewerkschaftsband (SGB)	Monbijoustrasse 61	599.799	198.917	46.941339°N 7.435997°E
8542	Swiss Alpine Museum	Swiss Alpine Museum	Helvetiaplatz 4	600.727	199.215	46.944019°N 7.448186°E
614	Schweizerisches Bundesarchiv Federal Archives of Switzerland	Schweizerisches Bundesarchiv; Federal Archives of Switzerland	Archivstrasse 24	600.612	198.812	46.940395°N 7.446675°E
652	Simsonbrunnen (fountain)	Simsonbrunnen (fountain)	Kramgasse	600.896	199.650	46.947932°N 7.450406°E
9165	SRG SSR idée suisse Swiss Broadcasting Corporation	SRG SSR idée suisse Swiss Broadcasting Corporation	Zentralarchiv der Generaldirektion Giacomettistrasse 3	602.672	199.228	46.944131°N 7.473732°E
8801	Staatsarchiv des Kantons Bern	Staatsarchiv des Kantons Bern	Falkenplatz 4	599.880	199.979	46.950892°N 7.437061°E
729	Stadttheater Bern City Theater	Stadttheater Bern City Theater	Kornhausplatz 20	600.680	199.804	46.949318°N 7.447569°E
655	Stift (college of canons)	Stift (college of canons)	Münsterplatz 1	600.947	199.545	46.946988°N 7.451076°E
730	Suva House	Suva House	Laupenstrasse 9	599.800	199.552	46.947051°N 7.43601°E
9778	Tscharner House	Tscharner House	Kramgasse 54	600.846	199.667	46.948085°N 7.44975°E
657	Tscharner House	Tscharner House	Münsterplatz 12	600.908	199.564	46.947159°N 7.450564°E
733	University of Bern, Main Building	University of Bern, Main Building	Hochschulstrasse 4	599.969	199.916	46.950326°N 7.43823°E
627	University of Bern, Institute	University of Bern, Institute	Baltzerstrasse 1–5	599.212	200.060	46.95162°N 7.428286°E
9297	University of Bern Institute for Medical History	University of Bern Institute for Medical History	Bühlstrasse 26	599.334	200.035	46.951396°N 7.429889°E
654; 9325	University Library (Former City and University Library)	University Library (Former City and University Library)	Münstergasse 61	600.791	199.585	46.947348°N 7.449027°E
734	Unteres Mayhaus	Unteres Mayhaus	Münstergasse 6	601.009	199.613	46.947599°N 7.451891°E
659	Untertorbrücke (bridge) and Felsenburg (castle on the far side of the Aare river)	Untertorbrücke (bridge) and Felsenburg (castle on the far side of the Aare river)	Klösterlistutz 2	601.510	199.815	46.949415°N 7.458472°E
660	Vennerbrunnen (fountain)	Vennerbrunnen (fountain)	Rathaus (Town council house)platz	601.047	199.704	46.948418°N 7.45239°E
737	Viktoria-Spital	Viktoria-Spital	Sonnenbergstrasse 14	600.863	200.170	46.95261°N 7.449974°E
738	The Villas on Thunplatz	The Villas on Thunplatz	Alpenstrasse 35 / Kirchfeldstrasse 88, 90 / Thunstrasse 52, 55, 59–61, 63	601.592	198.806	46.940339°N 7.459546°E
662	Von Wattenwyl House (also known as Frisching House)	Von Wattenwyl House (also known as Frisching House)	Junkerngasse 59	601.085	199.598	46.947464°N 7.452889°E
663	Waldau, formerly a Quarantine Building	Waldau, formerly a Quarantine Building	Bolligenstrasse 133	603.534	201.582	46.965302°N 7.485072°E
656	Wasserschloss am Thunplatz	Wasserschloss am Thunplatz		601.540	198.800	46.940285°N 7.458863°E
664	Zähringerbrunnen (fountain)	Zähringerbrunnen (fountain)	Kramgasse	600.803	199.649	46.947923°N 7.449185°E
9111	Zeerleder House	Zeerleder House	Junkerngasse 51	601.113	199.603	46.947509°N 7.453257°E
665	Zeitglockenturm (Clock Tower)	Zeitglockenturm (Clock Tower)		600.700	199.662	46.94804°N 7.447832°E
8561	Zentrum Paul Klee	Zentrum Paul Klee	Monument im Fruchtland	602.715	199.785	46.949142°N 7.4743°E
749	Zunfthaus zu Kaufleuten (Merchants' Guild House)	Zunfthaus zu Kaufleuten (Merchants' Guild House)	Kramgasse 29	600.922	199.639	46.947833°N 7.450748°E
Unknown	UNESCO World Heritage Site: Old City of Bern (since 1983)	UNESCO World Heritage Site: Old City of Bern (since 1983)				
Unknown	ISOS Verstädtertes Village: Bümpliz-Bethlehem	ISOS Verstädtertes Village: Bümpliz-Bethlehem				
Unknown		ISOS hamlet: Niederbottigen				
Unknown		ISOS hamlet: Riedern				
Unknown		ISOS hamlet: Riedbach (gemeinsam with Frauenkappelen)				
Unknown	ISOS Spezialfall: Waldau	ISOS Spezialfall: Waldau				

== Biel/Bienne ==
KGS No.^{?}	Picture	Name	Street Address	CH1903 X coordinate	CH1903 Y coordinate	Location
754	Alte Krone	Alte Krone	Obergasse 1	585.419	221.238	47.141957°N 7.246417°E
Unknown	Atelier Robert (Artist's Studio)	Atelier Robert (Artist's Studio)	Paul Robert-Weg 11	586.191	222.310	47.151616°N 7.256562°E
776	Former Manor House of Rockhall	Former Manor House of Rockhall	Seevorstadt 103	585.125	221.060	47.140349°N 7.242548°E
766	Main Train Station	Main Train Station	Bahnhofplatz 4	585.156	220.241	47.132983°N 7.242983°E
768	Jordi-Kocher House	Jordi-Kocher House	Zentralstrasse 45	585.423	220.720	47.137298°N 7.246487°E
773	Catholic Parish Church of St. Maria Immaculata	Catholic Parish Church of St. Maria Immaculata	Juravorstadt 45	585.700	221.550	47.14477°N 7.250112°E
774	Kongresshaus (Convention Center)	Kongresshaus (Convention Center)	Zentralstrasse 60	585.530	220.450	47.134872°N 7.247906°E
775	Kontrollgebäude	Kontrollgebäude	Zentralstrasse 45	585.485	220.683	47.136966°N 7.247305°E
8543; 8544	Museum Neuhaus and the Robert Foundation Collection	Museum Neuhaus and the Robert Foundation Collection	Schüsspromenade 26	585.087	220.895	47.138864°N 7.242052°E
8548	Museum Schwab	Museum Schwab	Seevorstadt 50	585.027	220.866	47.138602°N 7.241262°E
753	Swiss Reformed City Church of Biel	Swiss Reformed City Church of Biel	Ring 2	585.430	221.180	47.141436°N 7.246564°E
764	Administration Building and Montage Hall for General Motors	Administration Building and Montage Hall for General Motors	Salzhausstrasse 21	585.193	219.930	47.130187°N 7.243481°E
789	Volkshaus Building	Volkshaus Building	Bahnhofstrasse 11	585.211	220.401	47.134424°N 7.243703°E
762	Waldleute Zunft Building	Waldleute Zunft Building	Ring 8	585.437	221.198	47.141598°N 7.246656°E
Unknown		ISOS Stadt: Biel / Bienne				
Unknown	ISOS Spezialfall: Taubenlochschlucht	ISOS Spezialfall: Taubenlochschlucht				

== Bleienbach ==
KGS No.^{?}	Picture	Name	Street Address	CH1903 X coordinate	CH1903 Y coordinate	Location
Unknown		ISOS Village: Bleienbach				

== Blumenstein ==
KGS No.^{?}	Picture	Name	Street Address	CH1903 X coordinate	CH1903 Y coordinate	Location
794	Swiss Reformed Church	Swiss Reformed Church	Kirchenstrasse 26 / Blumensteinchilchen 167	605.762	174.979	46.725984°N 7.514012°E
Unknown		ISOS hamlet: Churches of Blumenstein/Wäsemli/Eschli				

== Bönigen ==
KGS No.^{?}	Picture	Name	Street Address	CH1903 X coordinate	CH1903 Y coordinate	Location
Unknown		ISOS Village: Bönigen				

== Bolligen ==
KGS No.^{?}	Picture	Name	Street Address	CH1903 X coordinate	CH1903 Y coordinate	Location
9201	Kleingewerbler House	Kleingewerbler House	Eisengasse 31	604.279	202.592	46.974383°N 7.494871°E
798	Wegmühle	Wegmühle	Bolligenstrasse 70–84	604.409	201.997	46.96903°N 7.496573°E
Unknown		ISOS Spezialfall: Worbletal				

== Boltigen ==
KGS No.^{?}	Picture	Name	Street Address	CH1903 X coordinate	CH1903 Y coordinate	Location
9202	Farm House	Farm House	Adlemsried 85	596.824	165.321	46.639122°N 7.397158°E
9770	Farm House	Farm House	Weissenbach 543	595.108	161.702	46.606557°N 7.374785°E
9555	Ranggiloch (Mesolithic Site)	Ranggiloch (Mesolithic Site)		592.375	164.925	46.635524°N 7.339059°E
Unknown	ISOS Village: Boltigen	ISOS Village: Boltigen				
Unknown		ISOS hamlet: Adlemsried				

== Bowil ==
KGS No.^{?}	Picture	Name	Street Address	CH1903 X coordinate	CH1903 Y coordinate	Location
9203	Hochstud House	Hochstud House	Oberhofen, Sagistrasse 3	619.334	194.497	46.901299°N 7.692375°E

== Bremgarten ==
KGS No.^{?}	Picture	Name	Street Address	CH1903 X coordinate	CH1903 Y coordinate	Location
806	Castle	Castle	Aeschenbrunnmattstrasse 2	600.354	202.944	46.977563°N 7.44329°E
Unknown		ISOS Spezialfall: Bremgarten bei Bern				

== Brienz ==
KGS No.^{?}	Picture	Name	Street Address	CH1903 X coordinate	CH1903 Y coordinate	Location
9556	Axalp, Abandoned Early Modern Alpine Village	Axalp, Abandoned Early Modern Alpine Village		645.730	172.125	46.698768°N 8.036548°E
810	Hotel Complex Giessbach	Hotel Complex Giessbach	Giessbach 1201, 1202	644.697	176.192	46.735422°N 8.023439°E
Unknown	ISOS Verstädtertes Village: Brienz (BE)	ISOS Verstädtertes Village: Brienz (BE)		644.697	176.192	46.735422°N 8.023439°E
Unknown		ISOS Spezialfall: Hotel Giessbach				

== Brienzwiler ==
KGS No.^{?}	Picture	Name	Street Address	CH1903 X coordinate	CH1903 Y coordinate	Location
8545	Schweizerisches Freilichtmuseum Ballenberg Swiss Open Air Museum, Ballenberg Shared With Hofstetten	Schweizerisches Freilichtmuseum Ballenberg; Swiss Open Air Museum, Ballenberg; Shared With Hofstetten		649.500	177.800	46.749547°N 8.08645°E
Unknown		ISOS Village: Brienzwiler				

== Brüttelen ==
KGS No.^{?}	Picture	Name	Street Address	CH1903 X coordinate	CH1903 Y coordinate	Location
Unknown		ISOS hamlet: Gäserz				

== Büren an der Aare ==
KGS No.^{?}	Picture	Name	Street Address	CH1903 X coordinate	CH1903 Y coordinate	Location
822	Castle	Castle	Hauptgasse 7	594.901	221.013	47.140074°N 7.37142°E
Unknown	ISOS Kleinstadt / Flecken: Büren an der Aare	ISOS Kleinstadt / Flecken: Büren an der Aare				

== Burgdorf ==
KGS No.^{?}	Picture	Name	Street Address	CH1903 X coordinate	CH1903 Y coordinate	Location
9557	Altstadt, Medieval and Early Modern City and Castle	Altstadt, Medieval and Early Modern City and Castle		614.290	211.680	47.05599°N 7.626719°E
829	Former Grosse Apotheke and Diesbacher House	Former Grosse Apotheke and Diesbacher House	Hohengasse 19, 21	614.338	211.729	47.05643°N 7.627352°E
9147	Former Mädchenschule (Girls' School)	Former Mädchenschule (Girls' School)	Neuengasse 5	614.167	211.626	47.055507°N 7.625098°E
9211	Former Niederspital (Hospital)	Former Niederspital (Hospital)	Metzgergasse 15	614.335	211.813	47.057185°N 7.627315°E
9212	Gehöft Grafenscheuren	Gehöft Grafenscheuren	Grafenscheuren 1–10	615.137	213.838	47.075382°N 7.637939°E
838	Grosshaus (Large House)	Grosshaus (Large House)	Hohengasse 4 / Kronenplatz 4	614.315	211.713	47.056286°N 7.627049°E
839	House zum Ochsen	House zum Ochsen	Hohengasse 35	614.326	211.651	47.055728°N 7.627192°E
9126	Villa Schnell	Villa Schnell	Bernstrasse 53–57	613.749	211.299	47.052574°N 7.619587°E
843	Kantonales Technikum (College)	Kantonales Technikum (College)	Technikumstrasse 7	613.810	211.875	47.057754°N 7.620407°E
844	Leinenweberei (Linen Spinning Plant) Schmid with Villa	Leinenweberei (Linen Spinning Plant) Schmid with Villa	Kirchbergstrasse 15	613.787	212.274	47.061344°N 7.620117°E
8546	Museum Franz Gertsch	Museum Franz Gertsch	Platanenstrasse 3 / Lyssachstrasse 3	614.170	211.895	47.057927°N 7.625146°E
826	Swiss Reformed City Church	Swiss Reformed City Church	Kirchbühl 24	614.150	211.728	47.056425°N 7.624878°E
11717		Sammlung Historisches Armeematerial (Collection of Historical Military Equipment) (Shared between Thun, Burgdorf and Dübendorf in Zurich)		615.000	210.200	47.042662°N 7.636015°E
827	Castle	Castle	Schlossgässli 1–4	614.476	211.544	47.054763°N 7.629163°E
832	Quarantine House and Chapel	Quarantine House and Chapel	Kapellenweg 2	614.840	212.450	47.062904°N 7.633983°E
850	Villa Roth	Villa Roth	Kreuzgraben 2	614.039	211.759	47.056706°N 7.623418°E
Unknown		ISOS Stadt: Burgdorf				

== Burgistein ==
KGS No.^{?}	Picture	Name	Street Address	CH1903 X coordinate	CH1903 Y coordinate	Location
852	Burgistein Castle	Burgistein Castle	Schloss 163	605.090	181.784	46.787203°N 7.505297°E

== Champoz ==
KGS No.^{?}	Picture	Name	Street Address	CH1903 X coordinate	CH1903 Y coordinate	Location
Unknown		ISOS village: Champoz				

== Corgémont ==
KGS No.^{?}	Picture	Name	Street Address	CH1903 X coordinate	CH1903 Y coordinate	Location
9295	Bibliothèque De La Conférence Mennonite Suisse	Bibliothèque De La Conférence Mennonite Suisse	Le Jean Guy	578.500	228.959	47.211217°N 7.154838°E

== Cortébert ==
KGS No.^{?}	Picture	Name	Street Address	CH1903 X coordinate	CH1903 Y coordinate	Location
Unknown		ISOS village: Cortébert				

== Crémines ==
KGS No.^{?}	Picture	Name	Street Address	CH1903 X coordinate	CH1903 Y coordinate	Location
Unknown		ISOS village: Crémines				

== Därstetten ==
KGS No.^{?}	Picture	Name	Street Address	CH1903 X coordinate	CH1903 Y coordinate	Location
864	Farm House (1642)	Farm House (1642)	Nidflue 309	605.293	168.003	46.663235°N 7.507796°E
9213	Farm House Argel	Farm House Argel	Zur Obern 161	603.427	166.664	46.651202°N 7.483405°E
862	Knuttihaus im Moos	Knuttihaus im Moos	Moos 47	604.054	167.216	46.656164°N 7.4916°E
Unknown		ISOS hamlet: Nidflue				
Unknown		ISOS hamlet: Wiler				
Unknown	ISOS Spezialfall: Därstetten Church / Moos	ISOS Spezialfall: Därstetten Church / Moos				
Unknown		ISOS Spezialfall: Weissenburg				

== Deisswil ==
KGS No.^{?}	Picture	Name	Street Address	CH1903 X coordinate	CH1903 Y coordinate	Location
Unknown		ISOS hamlet: Deisswil bei Münchenbuchsee				

== Diemtigen ==
KGS No.^{?}	Picture	Name	Street Address	CH1903 X coordinate	CH1903 Y coordinate	Location
869	Farm House	Farm House	Oey, Sälbezen 10	611.213	166.926	46.653473°N 7.585121°E
9773	Farm House	Farm House	Trogmatte 32	609.620	166.411	46.648866°N 7.5643°E
Unknown	ISOS Village: Diemtigen	ISOS Village: Diemtigen				

== Dotzigen ==
KGS No.^{?}	Picture	Name	Street Address	CH1903 X coordinate	CH1903 Y coordinate	Location
875	Mill	Mill	Lyssstrasse 24	593.120	218.501	47.117463°N 7.34798°E

== Dürrenroth ==
KGS No.^{?}	Picture	Name	Street Address	CH1903 X coordinate	CH1903 Y coordinate	Location
876		Farmhouse im Feld	Feld 93	626.873	214.593	47.081802°N 7.792505°E
9214	Gärbihof	Gärbihof	Gärbihof 1–9	626.206	215.459	47.089618°N 7.783772°E
877	Gasthof Bären	Gasthof Bären	Dorfstrasse 17	626.746	215.510	47.090055°N 7.790886°E
9777	Gasthof Kreuz	Gasthof Kreuz	Dorfstrasse 20	626.788	215.484	47.089819°N 7.791438°E
Unknown		ISOS Village: Dürrenroth				

== Eggiwil ==
KGS No.^{?}	Picture	Name	Street Address	CH1903 X coordinate	CH1903 Y coordinate	Location
9215	Farm House Inner-Zimmertsei	Farm House Inner-Zimmertsei	Inner-Zimmerzei 688–692	625.818	193.731	46.894189°N 7.777426°E
9558	Schweinsberg (An Earthwork from an Undetermined Era)	Schweinsberg (An Earthwork from an Undetermined Era)		626.160	194.150	46.897944°N 7.781938°E

== Epsach ==
KGS No.^{?}	Picture	Name	Street Address	CH1903 X coordinate	CH1903 Y coordinate	Location
Unknown		ISOS Village: Epsach				

== Erlach ==
KGS No.^{?}	Picture	Name	Street Address	CH1903 X coordinate	CH1903 Y coordinate	Location
8983	Rathaus (Town council house)	Rathaus (Town council house)	Altstadt 1	573.976	210.464	47.044695°N 7.096187°E
888	Erlach Castle	Erlach Castle	Altstadt 28	573.832	210.447	47.044537°N 7.094293°E
Unknown		ISOS Kleinstadt / Flecken: Erlach				

== Erlenbach ==
KGS No.^{?}	Picture	Name	Street Address	CH1903 X coordinate	CH1903 Y coordinate	Location
9216	Agenstein House	Agenstein House	Dorf 321	608.791	167.666	46.660166°N 7.553495°E
9779	Rectory	Rectory	Pfrandhubel 363	608.642	167.772	46.661122°N 7.55155°E
9527	Platz House	Platz House	Platz 317	608.619	167.673	46.660232°N 7.551248°E
891	Swiss Reformed Church	Swiss Reformed Church		608.680	167.750	46.660924°N 7.552046°E
9217	Ründi House	Ründi House	Dorf 305	608.794	167.740	46.660832°N 7.553535°E
Unknown		ISOS Village: Erlenbach im Simmental				
Unknown		ISOS hamlet: Balzenberg				

== Ersigen ==
KGS No.^{?}	Picture	Name	Street Address	CH1903 X coordinate	CH1903 Y coordinate	Location
9209	Gehöft	Gehöft	Unterdorf 9, 10	613.079	218.625	47.118485°N 7.610981°E
Unknown		ISOS Village: Niederösch				
Unknown		ISOS hamlet: Oberösch				

== Ferenbalm ==
KGS No.^{?}	Picture	Name	Street Address	CH1903 X coordinate	CH1903 Y coordinate	Location
893	Althus Jerisberghof	Althus Jerisberghof	Jerisberghof 133	582.888	200.829	46.958318°N 7.213822°E
9218	Farm House	Farm House	Statthalterhof	582.949	200.801	46.958067°N 7.214625°E
10460	Railroad-Viaduct BN over the Saane	Railroad-Viaduct BN over the Saane		585.135	198.290	46.935533°N 7.243426°E
9912	Ofen House	Ofen House	Jerisberghof 132	582.910	200.852	46.958525°N 7.214111°E
Unknown		ISOS Village: Gammen				
Unknown		ISOS hamlet: Jerisberghof				

== Fraubrunnen ==
KGS No.^{?}	Picture	Name	Street Address	CH1903 X coordinate	CH1903 Y coordinate	Location
1040	Swiss Reformed Church	Swiss Reformed Church	Chilchrain 15	604.230	217.305	47.106727°N 7.494364°E
Unknown		ISOS Village: Limpach				
Unknown		ISOS Village: Büren zum Hof				
Unknown		ISOS Village: Mülchi				

== Frauenkappelen ==
KGS No.^{?}	Picture	Name	Street Address	CH1903 X coordinate	CH1903 Y coordinate	Location
Unknown		ISOS hamlet: Riedbach (Shared with Bern)				
Unknown		ISOS hamlet: Wolei				

== Frutigen ==
KGS No.^{?}	Picture	Name	Street Address	CH1903 X coordinate	CH1903 Y coordinate	Location
Unknown		ISOS hamlet: Kanderbrück				
Unknown		ISOS Spezialfall: Rybrügg / Hasli				

== Gals ==
KGS No.^{?}	Picture	Name	Street Address	CH1903 X coordinate	CH1903 Y coordinate	Location
9559		Jolimont & Chlosterwald (Prehistoric Burial Mounds)		572.350	209.060	47.032001°N 7.074876°E
9219	Jolimont-Gut	Jolimont-Gut	Jolimont 103	573.043	209.803	47.038712°N 7.083949°E
Unknown		ISOS Village: Gals				
Unknown		ISOS Spezialfall: Jolimont-Gut				

== Gampelen ==
KGS No.^{?}	Picture	Name	Street Address	CH1903 X coordinate	CH1903 Y coordinate	Location
908	Rectory	Rectory	Oberdorfstrasse 11	571.215	207.280	47.015941°N 7.060057°E

== Gerzensee ==
KGS No.^{?}	Picture	Name	Street Address	CH1903 X coordinate	CH1903 Y coordinate	Location
912	The Freiherr's Farm House of Rütimatt	The Freiherr's Farm House of Rütimatt	Rütigässli 12	608.373	188.441	46.847052°N 7.548413°E
Unknown		ISOS Village: Gerzensee				
Unknown		ISOS hamlet: Vordere Chlapf				

== Grandval ==
KGS No.^{?}	Picture	Name	Street Address	CH1903 X coordinate	CH1903 Y coordinate	Location
916		Maison De La Dîme	Place Du Banneret Wisard 4	598.949	236.808	47.282164°N 7.424746°E
918	Maison du Banneret Wisard	Maison du Banneret Wisard	Place du Banneret Wisard 3	598.974	236.793	47.282029°N 7.425076°E
Unknown		(Suite) ISOS Village: Grandval				

== Grindelwald ==
KGS No.^{?}	Picture	Name	Street Address	CH1903 X coordinate	CH1903 Y coordinate	Location
10421	Jungfraubahn (Mountain Railway)	Jungfraubahn (Mountain Railway)		645.000	163.000	46.616736°N 8.026111°E
Unknown	ISOS Spezialfall: Kleine Scheidegg (Shared between Grindelwald and Lauterbrunnen)	ISOS Spezialfall: Kleine Scheidegg (Shared between Grindelwald and Lauterbrunnen)				

== Grosshöchstetten ==
KGS No.^{?}	Picture	Name	Street Address	CH1903 X coordinate	CH1903 Y coordinate	Location
1211	Castle and Park	Castle and Park	Schlossweg 8–10, Schlosswil	612.903	195.232	46.908067°N 7.607996°E

== Gsteig bei Gstaad ==
KGS No.^{?}	Picture	Name	Street Address	CH1903 X coordinate	CH1903 Y coordinate	Location
9220		Farm House	Saali 594	587.110	138.818	46.400596°N 7.27103°E
9771		Farm House	Feutersoey, Zelg 408	586.872	140.094	46.412069°N 7.267899°E
Unknown		ISOS Village: Gsteig				

== Gsteigwiler ==
KGS No.^{?}	Picture	Name	Street Address	CH1903 X coordinate	CH1903 Y coordinate	Location
Unknown		ISOS Village: Gsteig bei Interlaken				

== Guggisberg ==
KGS No.^{?}	Picture	Name	Street Address	CH1903 X coordinate	CH1903 Y coordinate	Location
9221	Trifelers Babis Stöckli	Trifelers Babis Stöckli	Dorf 74	591.666	179.534	46.766931°N 7.329535°E
Unknown		ISOS Village: Guggisberg				

== Guttannen ==
KGS No.^{?}	Picture	Name	Street Address	CH1903 X coordinate	CH1903 Y coordinate	Location
9044	Grimselstaumauer and Hospice	Grimselstaumauer and Hospice	Spittelnollen	668.307	158.263	46.572151°N 8.329659°E

== Hagneck ==
KGS No.^{?}	Picture	Name	Street Address	CH1903 X coordinate	CH1903 Y coordinate	Location
Unknown		ISOS Spezialfall: Elektrizitätswerk Hagneck				

== Hasle ==
KGS No.^{?}	Picture	Name	Street Address	CH1903 X coordinate	CH1903 Y coordinate	Location
930	Wooden Bridge	Wooden Bridge	Brückenstrasse / Winterseistrasse (Shared with Rüegsau)	615.980	207.785	47.020916°N 7.648825°E
Unknown		ISOS Village: Goldbach				
Unknown		ISOS hamlet: Bigel				

== Häutligen ==
KGS No.^{?}	Picture	Name	Street Address	CH1903 X coordinate	CH1903 Y coordinate	Location
Unknown		ISOS Village: Häutligen				

== Heimiswil ==
KGS No.^{?}	Picture	Name	Street Address	CH1903 X coordinate	CH1903 Y coordinate	Location
934	Eidgenössisches Mikrofilmarchiv (Federal Microfilm Archive)	Eidgenössisches Mikrofilmarchiv (Federal Microfilm Archive)	Ried	615.780	210.580	47.046062°N 7.646291°E
935	Church and Rectory	Church and Rectory	Oberdorf	616.819	212.699	47.065097°N 7.660043°E
Unknown		ISOS hamlet: Guetisberg				

== Herzogenbuchsee ==
KGS No.^{?}	Picture	Name	Street Address	CH1903 X coordinate	CH1903 Y coordinate	Location
937	Gasthof Kreuz	Gasthof Kreuz	Kirchgasse 1	620.326	226.363	47.187904°N 7.706823°E
9234	Mill and Buildings in the village of Oberönz	Mill and Buildings in the village of Oberönz	Bernstrasse 67	619.282	225.372	47.179021°N 7.693006°E
Unknown		ISOS Verstädtertes Village: Herzogenbuchsee				

== Hilterfingen ==
KGS No.^{?}	Picture	Name	Street Address	CH1903 X coordinate	CH1903 Y coordinate	Location
940	Hünegg Castle	Hünegg Castle	Staatsstrasse 52	616.531	176.312	46.737794°N 7.654931°E

== Hindelbank ==
KGS No.^{?}	Picture	Name	Street Address	CH1903 X coordinate	CH1903 Y coordinate	Location
943	Church	Church	Kirchweg 1	607.707	210.084	47.041743°N 7.540048°E
9780	Rectory	Rectory	Kirchweg 3	607.667	210.096	47.041852°N 7.539522°E
942	Hindelbank Castle	Hindelbank Castle	von Erlachweg 2	607.784	209.145	47.033296°N 7.541045°E
Unknown		ISOS Spezialfall: Castle				

== Hofstetten ==
KGS No.^{?}	Picture	Name	Street Address	CH1903 X coordinate	CH1903 Y coordinate	Location
813	Schweizerisches Freilichtmuseum Ballenberg (Shared with Brienzwiler)	Schweizerisches Freilichtmuseum Ballenberg (Shared with Brienzwiler)		649.500	177.800	46.749547°N 8.08645°E

== Huttwil ==
KGS No.^{?}	Picture	Name	Street Address	CH1903 X coordinate	CH1903 Y coordinate	Location
Unknown		ISOS Kleinstadt / Flecken: Huttwil				

== Innertkirchen ==
KGS No.^{?}	Picture	Name	Street Address	CH1903 X coordinate	CH1903 Y coordinate	Location
9223	Feldhaus	Feldhaus	Wyler Sunnsiten, Feldweg 6	661.625	173.430	46.709228°N 8.244535°E
9914	Saw Mill	Saw Mill	Mühletal, Uesers Milital 642 B	663.250	174.060	46.714743°N 8.265871°E

== Ins ==
KGS No.^{?}	Picture	Name	Street Address	CH1903 X coordinate	CH1903 Y coordinate	Location
953	Albert Anker House	Albert Anker House	Müntschemiergasse 7	574.822	206.082	47.005312°N 7.107562°E
10491	Farm House (Himmelriich)	Farm House (Himmelriich)	Rebstockweg 7	574.691	206.341	47.007637°N 7.105825°E
950	Fenis (Earthen Fortifications)	Fenis (Earthen Fortifications)		575.280	208.190	47.024291°N 7.11347°E
Unknown		ISOS Village: Ins				

== Interlaken ==
KGS No.^{?}	Picture	Name	Street Address	CH1903 X coordinate	CH1903 Y coordinate	Location
960	Former Monastery Building	Former Monastery Building	Schloss 5–17	632.525	170.725	46.686949°N 7.8638°E
957	Hotel Royal-St. Georges	Hotel Royal-St. Georges	Höheweg 139	632.436	170.928	46.68878°N 7.862651°E
955	Hotel Victoria-Jungfrau	Hotel Victoria-Jungfrau	Höheweg 41	631.987	170.678	46.686552°N 7.856764°E
954	Kursaal	Kursaal	Strandbadstrasse 44	632.094	170.903	46.688571°N 7.858179°E
Unknown		ISOS Verstädtertes Village: Interlaken				

== Iseltwald ==
KGS No.^{?}	Picture	Name	Street Address	CH1903 X coordinate	CH1903 Y coordinate	Location
Unknown	ISOS Village: Iseltwald	ISOS Village: Iseltwald				

== Ittigen ==
KGS No.^{?}	Picture	Name	Street Address	CH1903 X coordinate	CH1903 Y coordinate	Location
8780	Gosteli Foundation, Archive of the History of the Swiss Feminist Movement	Gosteli Foundation, Archive of the History of the Swiss Feminist Movement	Altikofenstrasse 186	601.813	203.191	46.979782°N 7.462466°E
Unknown		ISOS Spezialfall: Worbletal (Bolligen, Ittigen, Ostermundigen, Stettlen)				

== Jegenstorf ==
KGS No.^{?}	Picture	Name	Street Address	CH1903 X coordinate	CH1903 Y coordinate	Location
965	Swiss Reformed Church	Swiss Reformed Church	Solothurnstrasse 1	605.195	211.030	47.050277°N 7.507005°E
966	Jegenstorf Castle	Jegenstorf Castle	General-Guisanstrasse 1–5	605.394	210.758	47.047829°N 7.509621°E

== Kallnach ==
KGS No.^{?}	Picture	Name	Street Address	CH1903 X coordinate	CH1903 Y coordinate	Location
Unknown		ISOS Spezialfall: Elektrizitätswerk Kallnach				

== Kandergrund ==
KGS No.^{?}	Picture	Name	Street Address	CH1903 X coordinate	CH1903 Y coordinate	Location
969	Felsenburg	Felsenburg		618.000	153.427	46.531894°N 7.673257°E

== Kandersteg ==
KGS No.^{?}	Picture	Name	Street Address	CH1903 X coordinate	CH1903 Y coordinate	Location
972	Gasthof Ruedihaus (Hotel & Restaurant)	Gasthof Ruedihaus (Hotel & Restaurant)	Hinder De Büele 246 A	617.557	148.492	46.487513°N 7.667295°E

== Kehrsatz ==
KGS No.^{?}	Picture	Name	Street Address	CH1903 X coordinate	CH1903 Y coordinate	Location
973	Landsitz Lohn	Landsitz Lohn	Lohnweg 2	602.745	195.290	46.908708°N 7.474667°E

== Kiesen ==
KGS No.^{?}	Picture	Name	Street Address	CH1903 X coordinate	CH1903 Y coordinate	Location
9781	Schlossgut	Schlossgut	Bernstrasse 6	611.254	185.563	46.821121°N 7.586114°E

== Kirchberg ==
KGS No.^{?}	Picture	Name	Street Address	CH1903 X coordinate	CH1903 Y coordinate	Location
978	Kleehof (Dubois- Oder Tschiffeligut)	Kleehof (Dubois- Oder Tschiffeligut)	Chleehof 2–10	610.656	215.820	47.093298°N 7.578987°E
Unknown		ISOS hamlet: Bütikofen				

== Kirchdorf ==
KGS No.^{?}	Picture	Name	Street Address	CH1903 X coordinate	CH1903 Y coordinate	Location
9208	Granary	Granary	Filgesse 31, Mühledorf	607.504	186.039	46.825456°N 7.53698°E
Unknown		ISOS Village: Kirchdorf				

== Kirchlindach ==
KGS No.^{?}	Picture	Name	Street Address	CH1903 X coordinate	CH1903 Y coordinate	Location
10504	Halenbrücke (Bridge, shared with Bern)	Halenbrücke (Bridge, shared with Bern)	Halenstrasse	598.450	202.280	46.971588°N 7.418269°E
10503	Neubrügg (Bridge, shared with Bern)	Neubrügg (Bridge, shared with Bern)	Stuckishausstrasse / Neubrückstrasse	599.200	202.520	46.973748°N 7.428124°E
985	Siedlung Halen (Settlement)	Siedlung Halen (Settlement)	Herrenschwanden	598.080	202.390	46.972577°N 7.413406°E
Unknown		ISOS Spezialfall: Siedlung Halen				

== Köniz ==
KGS No.^{?}	Picture	Name	Street Address	CH1903 X coordinate	CH1903 Y coordinate	Location
988	Farm House	Farm House	Herzwilstrasse 175	595.594	196.041	46.915454°N 7.380798°E
9560	Chly-Wabere (Roman Era Farmhouse)	Chly-Wabere (Roman Era Farmhouse)		601.865	196.380	46.918516°N 7.463121°E
987	Former Commandry with Castle, Church and Outbuildings	Former Commandry with Castle, Church and Outbuildings	Muhlernstrasse 1–15	598.114	196.644	46.92089°N 7.413877°E
994	Herrenstock	Herrenstock	Niederscherli, Schwarzenburgstrasse 810	596.148	192.645	46.88491°N 7.388099°E
992	Hof Burren	Hof Burren	Mengestorf, Mengestorfbergstrasse 191, 193	596.124	194.235	46.899212°N 7.387771°E
990	Noble's Wooden House	Noble's Wooden House	Grossgschneit, Grossgschneitstrasse 30	595.269	191.149	46.871447°N 7.376582°E
989	Villa Morillon	Villa Morillon	Morillonstrasse 45	599.795	198.050	46.93354°N 7.435945°E
Unknown		ISOS hamlet: Gurtendörfli				
Unknown		ISOS hamlet: Herzwil				
Unknown		ISOS hamlet: Liebewil				
Unknown		ISOS hamlet: Mengestorf				

== Koppigen ==
KGS No.^{?}	Picture	Name	Street Address	CH1903 X coordinate	CH1903 Y coordinate	Location
9224	Former Gasthof Bären with Outbuildings in the Hamlet of St. Niklaus	Former Gasthof Bären with Outbuildings in the Hamlet of St. Niklaus	Bern-Zürichstrasse 28	613.278	219.955	47.130444°N 7.613642°E

== La Ferrière ==
KGS No.^{?}	Picture	Name	Street Address	CH1903 X coordinate	CH1903 Y coordinate	Location
9526		Maison Gagnebin	Le Pavillon	558.619	221.477	47.142974°N 6.893102°E

== La Neuveville ==
KGS No.^{?}	Picture	Name	Street Address	CH1903 X coordinate	CH1903 Y coordinate	Location
1105	Blanche Église Réformée (White Church)	Blanche Église Réformée (White Church)	Chemin De La Blanche Eglise 2	574.055	212.650	47.064361°N 7.097101°E
1107	Cour Gléresse / Hof Ligerz	Cour Gléresse / Hof Ligerz	Route de Bienne 66	576.840	214.752	47.083372°N 7.133655°E
1104	Fontaines Des Bannerets	Fontaines Des Bannerets	Rue Du Marché	573.703	212.546	47.063412°N 7.092474°E
9916	City fortifications	City fortifications		573.686	212.456	47.062602°N 7.092255°E
1109	Hôtel de Ville	Hôtel de Ville	Ruelle de l’Hôtel de Ville 11	573.736	212.584	47.063755°N 7.092906°E
1111	Maison de Berne	Maison de Berne	Rue du port 14	573.739	212.402	47.062118°N 7.092956°E
1110	Maison des Dragons	Maison des Dragons	Rue du Marché 27	573.749	212.475	47.062775°N 7.093083°E
Unknown		ISOS petite ville / bourg: La Neuveville				
Unknown		ISOS hameau: Chavannes				

== Langenthal ==
KGS No.^{?}	Picture	Name	Street Address	CH1903 X coordinate	CH1903 Y coordinate	Location
1011	Kaufhaus	Kaufhaus	Marktgasse 13	626.574	229.104	47.212336°N 7.789421°E
1009	Mill	Mill	Mühleweg 23	626.785	229.363	47.214657°N 7.792222°E
9572		Unterhard archeological site with Graves and Settlements from Various Epochs		626.300	231.100	47.230301°N 7.785921°E
Unknown		ISOS Kleinstadt / Flecken: Langenthal				
Unknown		ISOS hamlet: Chlyrot				

== Langnau ==
KGS No.^{?}	Picture	Name	Street Address	CH1903 X coordinate	CH1903 Y coordinate	Location
1015	Farm House Dürsrüti	Farm House Dürsrüti	Unter-Dürsrüti 391	625.086	199.869	46.949429°N 7.768159°E
1012	Chüechli House	Chüechli House	Bärenplatz 2	626.340	199.105	46.942508°N 7.784587°E
1018	Swiss Reformed Church	Swiss Reformed Church	Bärenplatz 5	626.380	199.026	46.941796°N 7.785108°E
Unknown		ISOS Verstädtertes Village: Langnau im Emmental				

== Lauenen ==
KGS No.^{?}	Picture	Name	Street Address	CH1903 X coordinate	CH1903 Y coordinate	Location
1021	Former Farm House with Mill	Former Farm House with Mill	Dorf 247	591.075	141.462	46.424444°N 7.322536°E

== Laupen ==
KGS No.^{?}	Picture	Name	Street Address	CH1903 X coordinate	CH1903 Y coordinate	Location
1023	Laupen Castle	Laupen Castle	Schloss 1	584.996	194.584	46.902194°N 7.241723°E
Unknown		ISOS Kleinstadt / Flecken: Laupen				

== Lauperswil ==
KGS No.^{?}	Picture	Name	Street Address	CH1903 X coordinate	CH1903 Y coordinate	Location
1027	Farm House	Farm House	Kalchmatt 23	622.844	202.189	46.970379°N 7.738826°E
1026	Church	Church	Dorf 45	623.046	201.731	46.966252°N 7.741457°E
Unknown		ISOS hamlet: Längenbach				
Unknown		ISOS hamlet: Witenbach				

== Lauterbrunnen ==
KGS No.^{?}	Picture	Name	Street Address	CH1903 X coordinate	CH1903 Y coordinate	Location
9918	Luftseilbahn Stechelberg – Schilthorn (Aerial lift)	Luftseilbahn Stechelberg – Schilthorn (Aerial lift)		635.000	160.000	46.590348°N 7.895336°E
9573	Trachsellauenen, Medieval/Early Modern Silver Mine	Trachsellauenen, Medieval/Early Modern Silver Mine		635.500	152.600	46.523756°N 7.901291°E
Unknown		ISOS hamlet: Gimmelwald				
Unknown		ISOS Spezialfall: Kleine Scheidegg (Grindelwald, Lauterbrunnen)				

== Leuzigen ==
KGS No.^{?}	Picture	Name	Street Address	CH1903 X coordinate	CH1903 Y coordinate	Location
Unknown		ISOS Village: Leuzigen				

== Ligerz ==
KGS No.^{?}	Picture	Name	Street Address	CH1903 X coordinate	CH1903 Y coordinate	Location
9204	Aarberger House	Aarberger House	Hauptstrasse 19	577.064	214.922	47.084909°N 7.136596°E
1038	Gaberel House Nr. 53	Gaberel House Nr. 53	Dorfgasse 20	577.119	214.955	47.085208°N 7.137318°E
1037	Church	Church	Charrière 12	576.976	215.029	47.085868°N 7.135431°E
Unknown		ISOS Village: Ligerz				
Unknown		ISOS hamlet: Bipschal				

== Lotzwil ==
KGS No.^{?}	Picture	Name	Street Address	CH1903 X coordinate	CH1903 Y coordinate	Location
9205	Farm House Ingold-Hof	Farm House Ingold-Hof	Huttwilstrasse 5	626.739	226.627	47.19005°N 7.791452°E
1041	Rectory	Rectory	Kirchgasse 3	626.587	226.709	47.190794°N 7.789452°E

== Lüscherz ==
KGS No.^{?}	Picture	Name	Street Address	CH1903 X coordinate	CH1903 Y coordinate	Location
9574		Schaltenrain / Grossholz; Hallstatt era burial mounds		577.170	208.730	47.029216°N 7.138304°E

== Lützelflüh ==
KGS No.^{?}	Picture	Name	Street Address	CH1903 X coordinate	CH1903 Y coordinate	Location
1045	Former Mill (Kulturmühle)	Former Mill (Kulturmühle)	Mühlegasse 29	619.451	206.026	47.005001°N 7.694404°E
1046	Rectory	Rectory	Rainbergliweg 2	618.912	206.443	47.008767°N 7.687334°E
Unknown		ISOS Village: Lützelflüh				
Unknown		ISOS Village: Trachselwald (Lützelflüh, Trachselwald)				
Unknown		ISOS Village: Trachselwald (Lützelflüh, Trachselwald)				
Unknown		ISOS hamlet: Flüelen				
Unknown		ISOS hamlet: Schufelbüel				
Unknown		ISOS hamlet: Waldhaus				

== Lyssach ==
KGS No.^{?}	Picture	Name	Street Address	CH1903 X coordinate	CH1903 Y coordinate	Location
Unknown		ISOS Village: Lyssach				

== Mattstetten ==
KGS No.^{?}	Picture	Name	Street Address	CH1903 X coordinate	CH1903 Y coordinate	Location
9493	Dorfbrunnen (fountain)	Dorfbrunnen (fountain)	Jegenstorfstrasse	605.699	208.781	47.030043°N 7.51361°E

== Meienried ==
KGS No.^{?}	Picture	Name	Street Address	CH1903 X coordinate	CH1903 Y coordinate	Location
Unknown		ISOS Spezialfall: Meienried				

== Meiringen ==
KGS No.^{?}	Picture	Name	Street Address	CH1903 X coordinate	CH1903 Y coordinate	Location
9050	Hotel Sauvage	Hotel Sauvage	Bahnhofstrasse 30	657.270	175.312	46.726545°N 8.187821°E
1059	Swiss Reformed Church with Outbuildings	Swiss Reformed Church with Outbuildings	Bei der Kirche 2–6	657.370	175.650	46.729577°N 8.189171°E
9921	Reichenbachfall-Bahn	Reichenbachfall-Bahn		657.000	175.000	46.723762°N 8.18425°E
Unknown		ISOS Verstädtertes Village: Meiringen				
Unknown		ISOS hamlet: Brünigen				

== Melchnau ==
KGS No.^{?}	Picture	Name	Street Address	CH1903 X coordinate	CH1903 Y coordinate	Location
9207		Käserstock	Dorfstrasse 78	631.284	225.755	47.182007°N 7.851361°E
9206		Stock des Birlihofs	Birlihof 121 A	630.501	225.514	47.179876°N 7.841015°E

== Moosseedorf ==
KGS No.^{?}	Picture	Name	Street Address	CH1903 X coordinate	CH1903 Y coordinate	Location
1069	Moosbühl (Paleolithic Settlement)	Moosbühl (Paleolithic Settlement)		603.935	206.995	47.013991°N 7.490388°E
Unknown		ISOS Spezialfall: Im Sand				

== Mötschwil ==
KGS No.^{?}	Picture	Name	Street Address	CH1903 X coordinate	CH1903 Y coordinate	Location
Unknown		ISOS hamlet: Mötschwil				

== Mühleberg ==
KGS No.^{?}	Picture	Name	Street Address	CH1903 X coordinate	CH1903 Y coordinate	Location
1081	Railroad-Viaduct BN over the Saane (Shared with Ferenbalm)	Railroad-Viaduct BN over the Saane (Shared with Ferenbalm)	Gümmenenau	585.135	198.290	46.935533°N 7.243426°E
Unknown		ISOS Spezialfall: Kraftwerk Mühleberg				

== Münchenbuchsee ==
KGS No.^{?}	Picture	Name	Street Address	CH1903 X coordinate	CH1903 Y coordinate	Location
9497	Badeanstalt Hofwil (Swimming Facility)	Badeanstalt Hofwil (Swimming Facility)	Hofwilstrasse	602.071	207.911	47.022238°N 7.465878°E
1088	Hofwil Institution	Hofwil Institution		601.816	207.706	47.020395°N 7.462523°E
10548	Hofwil Castle	Hofwil Castle	Hofwilstrasse 36	601.703	207.777	47.021034°N 7.461037°E
Unknown		ISOS Spezialfall: Hofwil				

== Münchenwiler ==
KGS No.^{?}	Picture	Name	Street Address	CH1903 X coordinate	CH1903 Y coordinate	Location
1089	Castle with Park	Castle with Park	Kühergasse 7	576.255	195.720	46.912157°N 7.126946°E
Unknown		ISOS Village: Münchenwiler				

== Münsingen ==
KGS No.^{?}	Picture	Name	Street Address	CH1903 X coordinate	CH1903 Y coordinate	Location
10556	Münsingen Clinic Building	Münsingen Clinic Building	Hunzikenstrasse 1	608.728	192.160	46.880501°N 7.553138°E
1093	Rectory	Rectory	Pfarrstutz	609.246	191.982	46.878893°N 7.55993°E
9038	Produktions- and Verwaltungsanlage USM (USM Factory and Corporate Offices)	Produktions- and Verwaltungsanlage USM (USM Factory and Corporate Offices)		609.665	190.550	46.866006°N 7.565397°E
Unknown		ISOS Spezialfall: Anstalt Münsingen				

== Muri bei Bern ==
KGS No.^{?}	Picture	Name	Street Address	CH1903 X coordinate	CH1903 Y coordinate	Location
1097	Hofgut	Hofgut	Vordere Dorfgasse 12–20	605.596	198.075	46.933742°N 7.512123°E
1098	Gümligen Castle	Gümligen Castle	Dorfstrasse 107	605.830	198.181	46.934693°N 7.515197°E
