= List of fountains in Bern =

This is a list of fountains in Bern. The city of Bern, Switzerland, is known for its 16th-century fountains, attributed to Hans Gieng.

For a description of the 16th-century fountains, see the Old City of Bern.

Image	Name	Translation	Year	Artist	Street/Square Coordinates
Pfeiferbrunnen	Pfeiferbrunnen	Piper	16th century	Hans Gieng	Spitalgasse
Schützenbrunnen	Schützenbrunnen	Marksman	16th century	Hans Gieng	Marktgasse
Anna-Seiler-Brunnen	Anna-Seiler-Brunnen	Anna Seiler	16th century	Hans Gieng	Marktgasse
Zähringerbrunnen	Zähringerbrunnen	Zähringen	16th century	Hans Hiltbrand	Kramgasse
Vennerbrunnen	Vennerbrunnen	Banneret	16th century	Hans Gieng	Rathausplatz
Simsonbrunnen	Simsonbrunnen	Samson	16th century	Hans Gieng	Kramgasse
Gerechtigkeitsbrunnen	Gerechtigkeitsbrunnen	Justice	16th century	Hans Gieng	Gerechtigkeitsgasse
Läuferbrunnen	Läuferbrunnen	Messenger	16th century	Hans Gieng	Läuferplatz
Mosesbrunnen	Mosesbrunnen	Moses	16th century	Hans Gieng	Münsterplatz
Ryfflibrunnen	Ryfflibrunnen	Ryffli (Famous Shooter)	16th Century	Hans Gieng	Aarbergergasse
Kindlifresserbrunnen	Kindlifresserbrunnen	Child Eater or Ogre	16th century	Hans Gieng	Kornhausplatz
Münzbrunnen	Münzbrunnen	Coin Fountain	1789–1792		Schwarztorstrasse
Bernabrunnen	Bernabrunnen	Berna	1858/1863	Raphael Christen	Federal Palace
Welttelegrafen-Denkmal	Welttelegrafen-Denkmal	ITU memorial	1922	Giuseppe Romagnoli	Helvetiaplatz
Weltpostdenkmal	Weltpostdenkmal	UPU memorial	1909	René de Saint-Marceaux	Kleine Schanze
