= Berlin Philharmonic Chamber Orchestra =

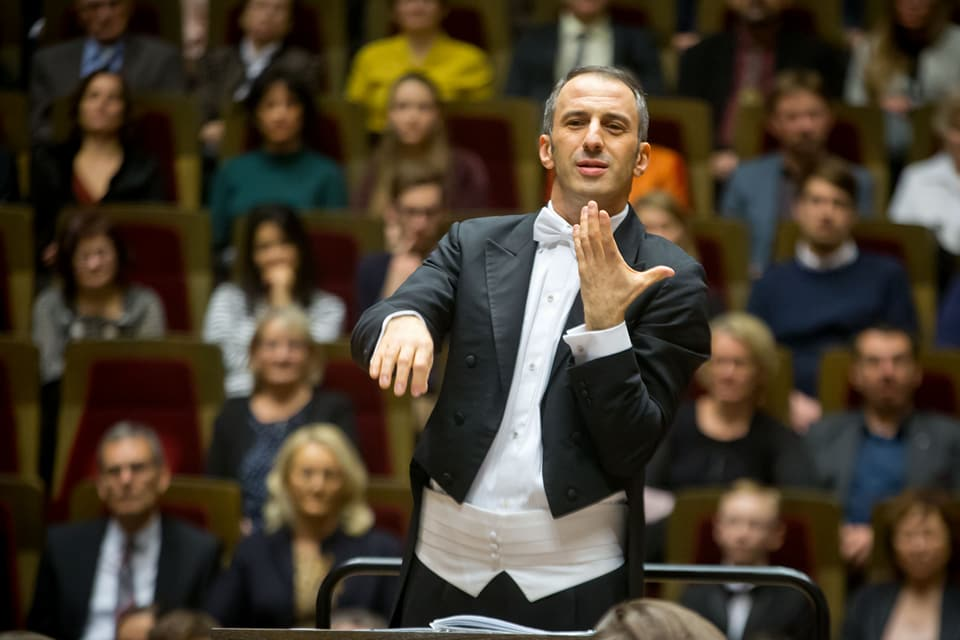
Michael Zukernik, conductor of PKB

The Philharmonisches Kammerorchester Berlin (PKB) is a nonprofit chamber orchestra and music organization. Founded 2002 as Berliner Kammerphilharmonie, it focuses on the interpretation of classical music. Its founder and Artistic Director is the German (Russian-born) conductor Michael Zukernik.

The PKB has collaborated with artists such as Guy Braunstein, Emmanuel Pahud, Wenzel Fuchs and Anna Prohaska. Concerts are held, among others, at the Berlin Philharmonie, the Konzerthaus Berlin, the Gewandhaus Leipzig, the French Cathedral in Berlin, and the Berlin Cathedral. The orchestra has also played at the Tonhalle Zürich, Victoria Hall Geneva, and the Casino of Bern in Switzerland.

The orchestra has organised national and international master classes for orchestra conductors since 2003. The course instructors have included Jorma Panula, Gennady Rozhdestvensky, Leif Segerstam, Gustav Meier, János Fürst, Eri Klas, Michail Jurowski and Colin Metters. The courses are held in European cities including Moscow, St. Petersburg and Berlin.
