= Münsterplatz =

Münsterplatz may refer to:

- Münsterplatz (Bern)
- Münsterplatz (Basel), a city square in Basel Minster

== See also ==
- Münsterhof, a town square in Zürich
