= Zähringerstadt =

Quarter in Bern, Switzerland

Coordinates: 46°56′52.7″N 7°27′4.5″E

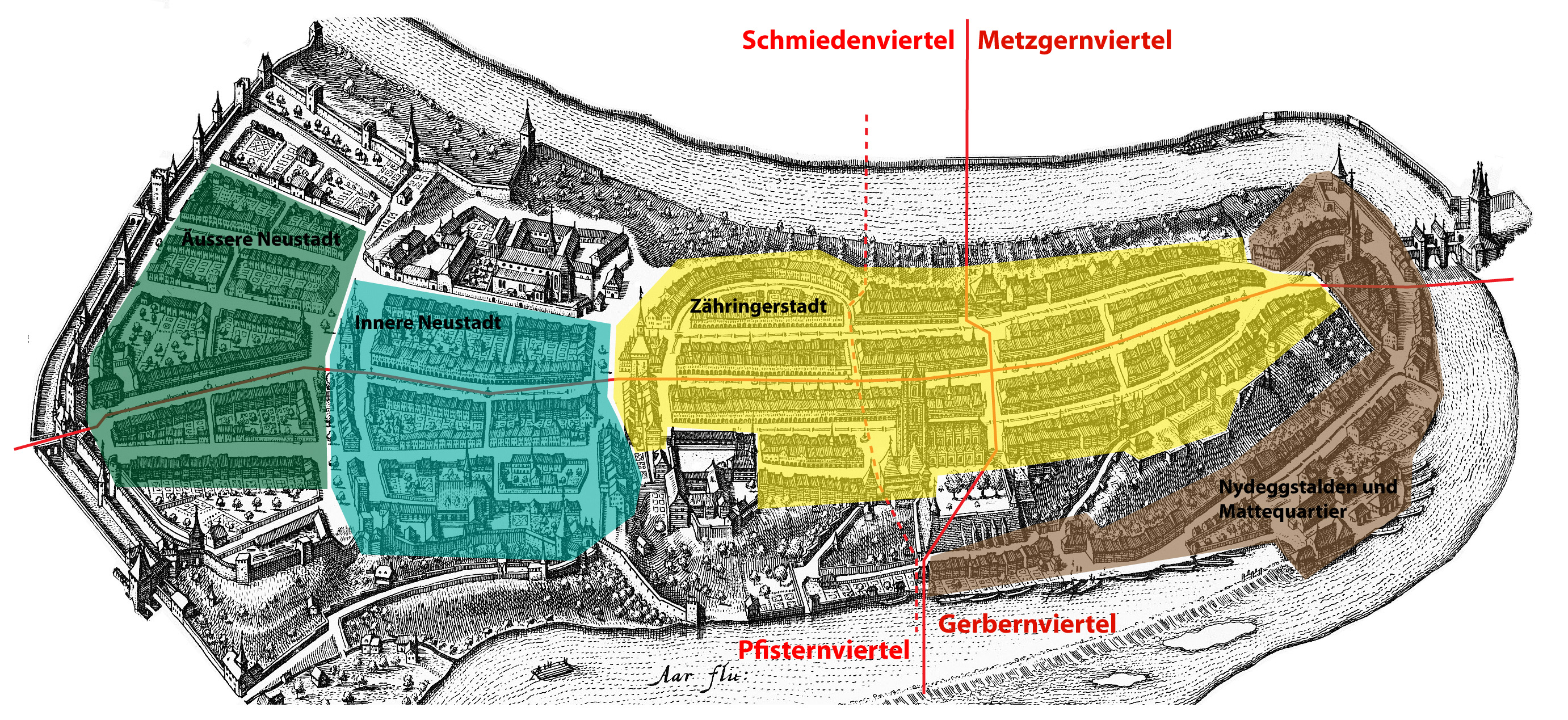
The Viertel and Quartiere of the old city. (click to enlarge)

The Zähringerstadt (Swiss Standard German pronunciation: [ˈtsɛːrɪŋərˌʃtat]) is a historic section in the Old City of Bern in Bern, Switzerland.

The first expansion of Bern occurred as the city was founded in 1191. This central and oldest neighbourhood was known as the Zähringerstadt (Zähringer town) after the founder, Duke Berthold V of Zähringen. Most likely the first city started at Nydegg Castle on the Aare river and reached west on the narrow peninsula to the Zytglogge (Swiss German: clock tower). The city was divided by three longitudinal streets, which stretched from the Castle to the city wall. Both the position of the town church and the shape of the eaves were typical for a Zähringer city.

During the first half of the 13th Century two additional streets (Brunngasse and Herrengasse) were added. Brunngasse was a semi-circular street on the north edge of the city, while Herrengasse was on the south side of the city. A wood bridge was built over the Aare River which allowed increased trade and limited settlements on the east bank of the river.

The Zähringerstadt contained the medieval city's principal political, economic and spiritual institutions. These were strictly separated: official buildings were situated around the Kreuzgasse (Cross Alley), ecclesiastical buildings were located at the Münstergasse (Cathedral Alley) and Herrengasse (Lords' Alley), while guilds and merchants' shops clustered around the central Kramgasse (Grocers Alley) and Gerechtigkeitsgasse (Justice Alley). Junkerngasse (Junker Lane), which is parallel to Gerechtigkeitsgasse, was originally known as Kilchgasse (Church Lane) but was renamed because of number of patricians or untitled nobility which lived on the southern side of the peninsula.

The original city wall between the Zähringerstadt and the Innere Neustadt was demolished during a later expansion and Kornhausplatz grew up in the area of the wall. The original city gate became the Zytglogge.
