= Felsenburg (Bern) =

Historical castle in Bern, Switzerland

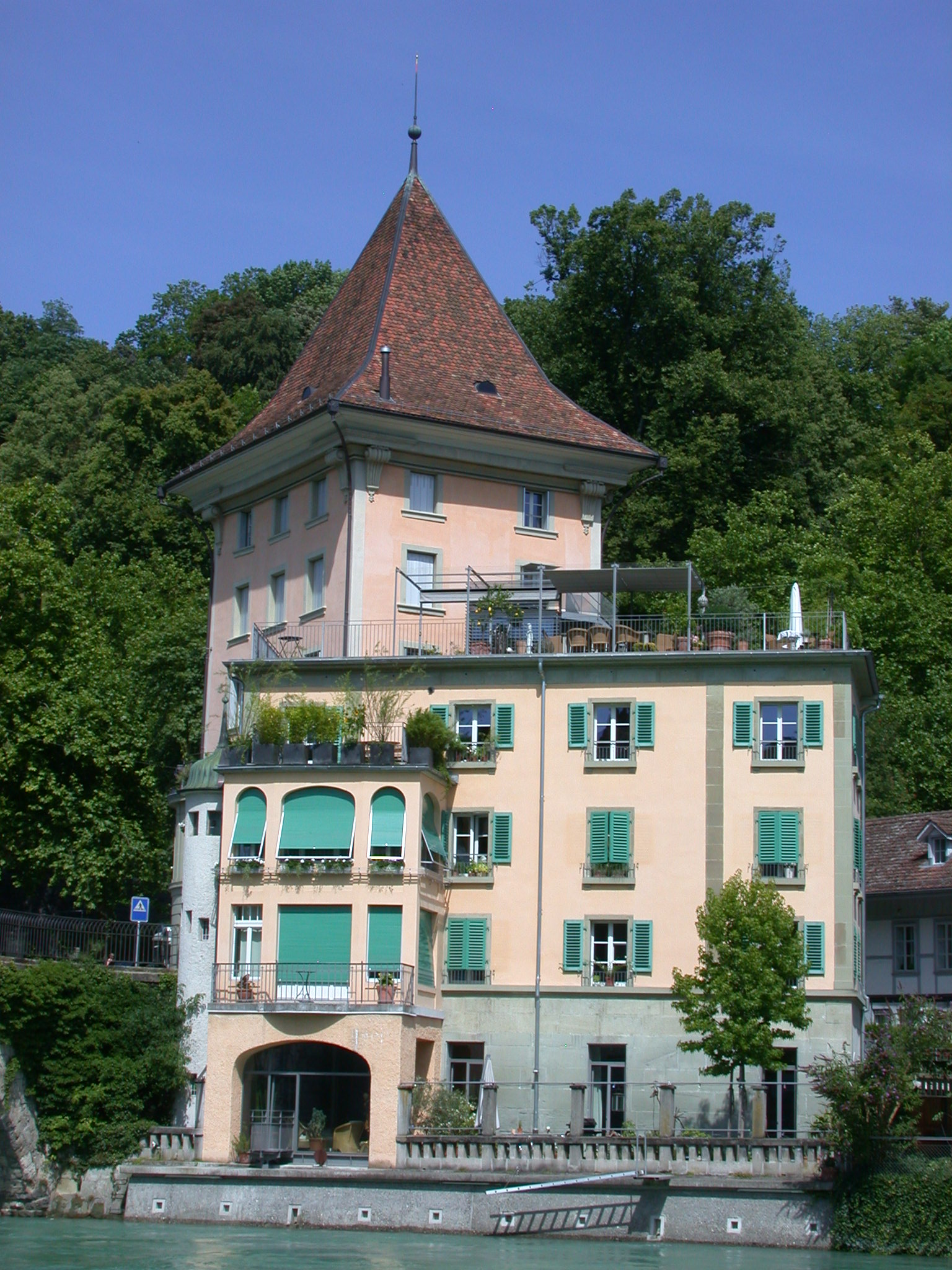
- The Felsenburg

- Location within Switzerland
- 46°56′57.89″N 7°27′30.5″E
- Location: Old City of Bern

History
- Built: 1260-1270

Site notes
- Governing body: Privately Owned

UNESCO World Heritage Site
- Part of: Old City of Bern world heritage site

Swiss Cultural Property of National Significance

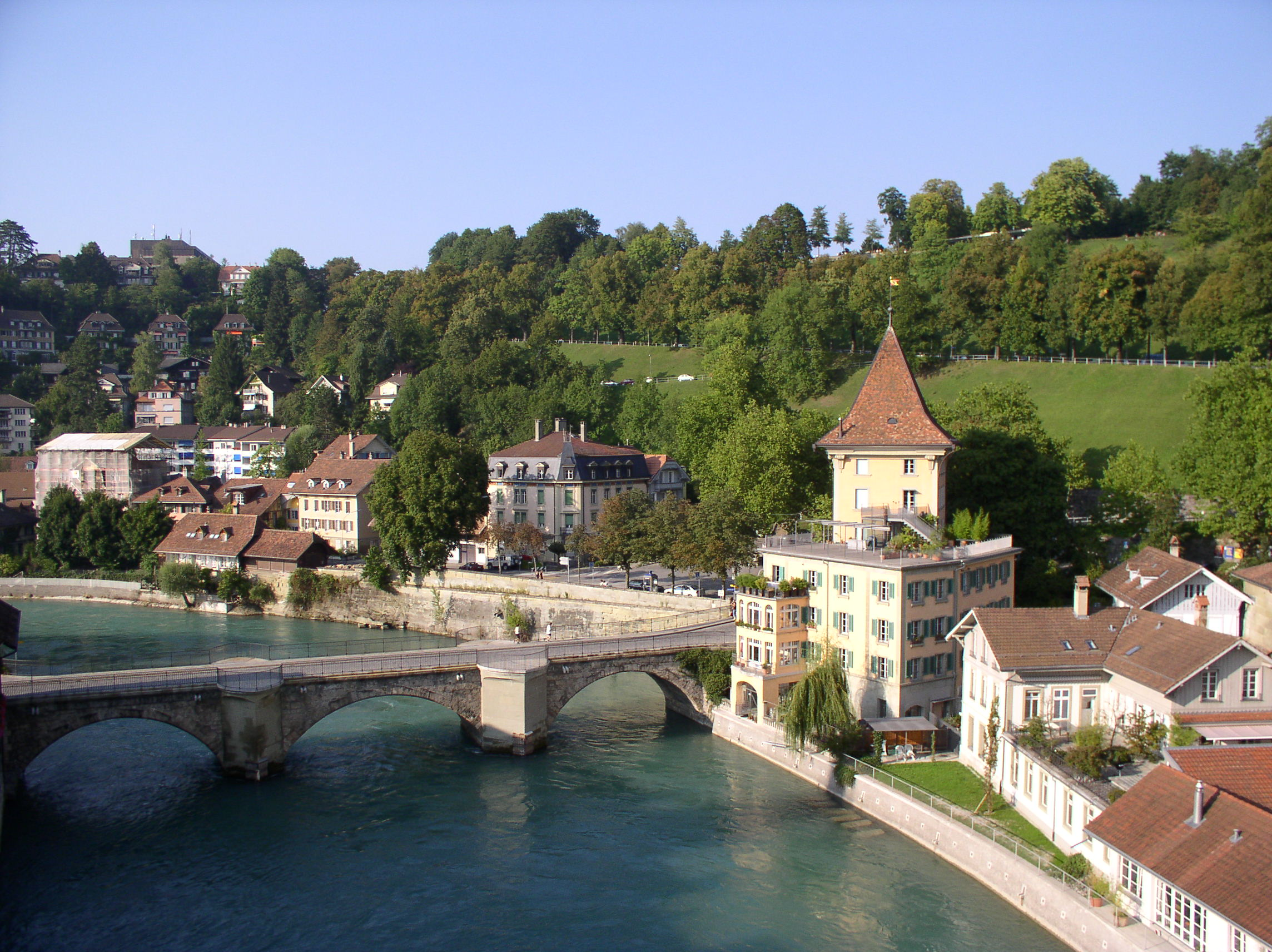
The Untertorbrücke and the Felsenburg castle

The Felsenburg is a fortified castle and tower in the city of Bern, Switzerland. It is part of the UNESCO Cultural World Heritage Site of the Old City of Bern and, together with the adjacent Untertorbrücke, it is a cultural property of national significance

== History ==
The Felsenburg was built soon after the construction of the first Untertor Bridge connected the medieval city of Bern to the eastern bank of the Aare river. It was built as part of the defenses of the city and served to secure the eastern end of the bridge. The Felsenburg was probably built in 1260–70, but it is first mentioned in 1335. The original tower was open in the back, toward the city. The entire tower was renovated in 1583 and the open side was closed. During the renovation, the coat of arms of the Bernese city-state were painted on the exterior.

Between 1625 and 1630, the gate was fortified, the end of the bridge was moved to the north, a new bridge was built over the moat and a bastion was added on the moat side. The next renovation took place in 1760–61. The gate arch was rebuilt and the tower's facade was completely redone. In 1783, a new, stone bridge was built over the moat and in 1820-21 the moat was filled in with stone. In 1862 the tower was sold to a private owner. Over the next two years, the new owner converted the tower into a rental house. Stairs were added to the north-east face and the gate arch from 1761 was demolished.

== Tower appearance ==
The tower is rectangular in cross section. The longer sides are oriented to the north-west and south-east. The ground floor is 10.2 m × 8.8 m (33 ft × 29 ft). The north-east wall, that faced the moat, was originally part of the city wall. In the basement it is 2.2 m (7.2 ft) thick. The ground floor wall is 1.85 m (6.1 ft) while on the upper story it is only 65 cm (2 ft 2 in) thick. The south-west wall, which faced the city, is between 40 and 50 cm (1 ft 4 in and 1 ft 8 in) thick. The five residential floors were all given rectangular windows during the conversion in 1862–64.

== See also ==
- List of castles in Switzerland
