= Bern Botanical Garden =

Botanical garden in Bern, Switzerland

Coordinates: 46.95270°N 7.44491°E

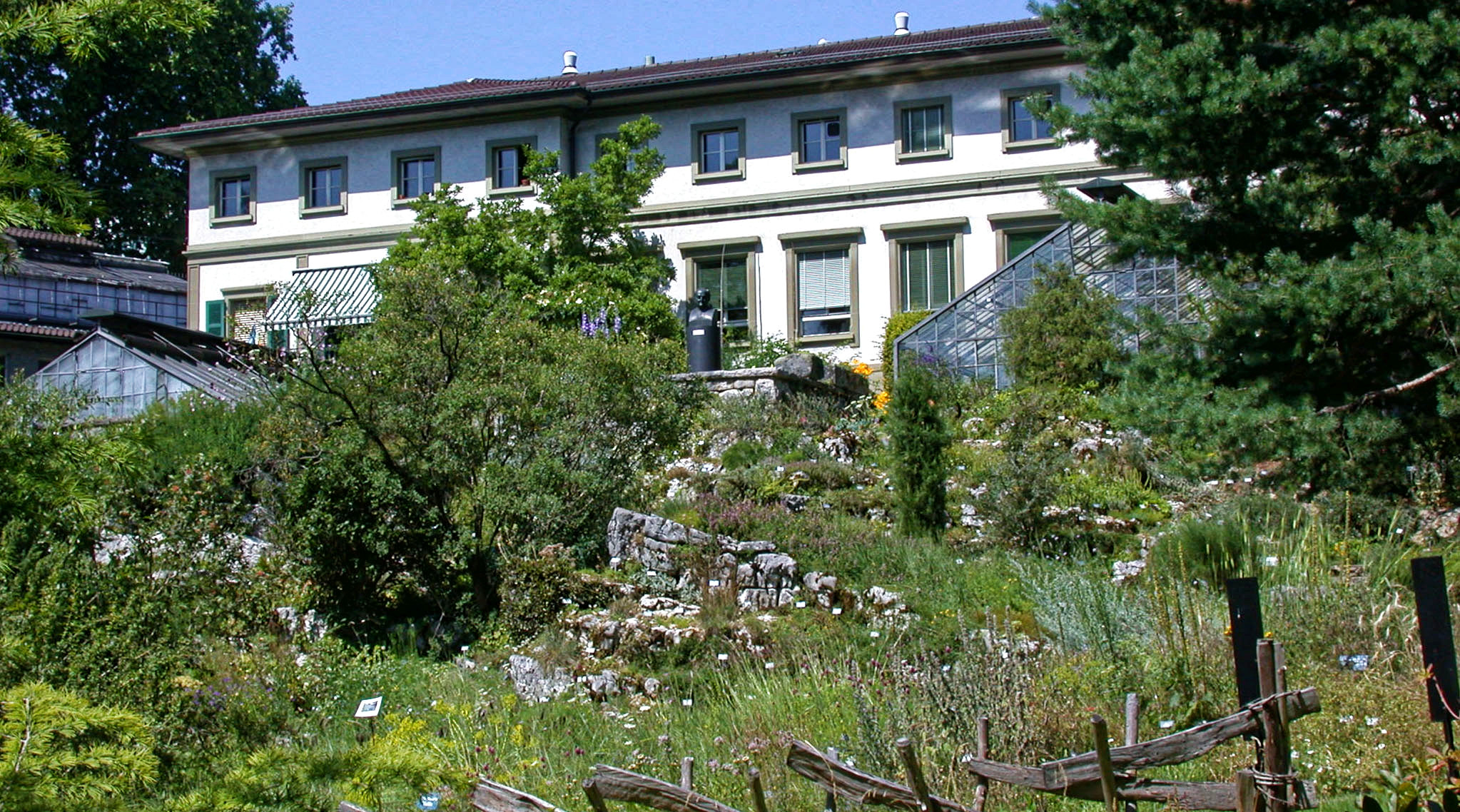
The Bern Botanical Garden

The Bern Botanical Garden (German: Botanischer Garten Bern; BOGA) is a botanical garden located in Bern, the capital city of Switzerland.

The garden is listed as a cultural property of national significance.
