= Wittigkofen Castle =

Castle in Bern, Switzerland

- Bern
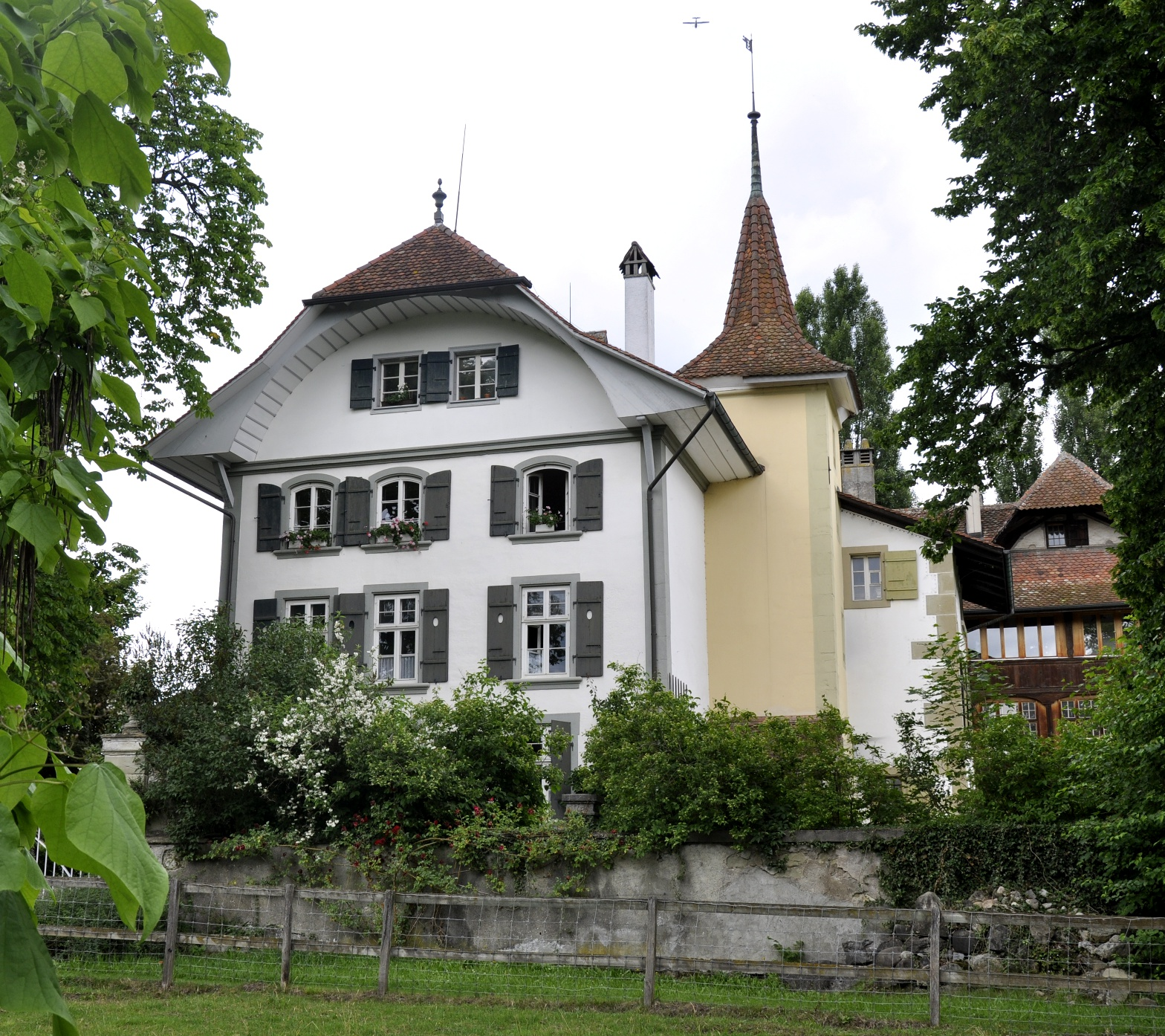
- Wittigkofen Castle

Location
- Coordinates: 46.94257°N 7.48174°E

Wittigkofen Castle is a castle in the municipality of Bern of the Canton of Bern in Switzerland. It is a Swiss heritage site of national significance.

== History ==
Wittigkofen Castle was originally built as a residence for a farm and was awarded to the followers of the Zähringians. In the mid thirteenth century Heinricus Wittenchoven managed the farm. He was a member of the council and the first documented feudal superior. The property was also home to the monastery of Interlaken. The castle had several owners and belonged to different families. Beat Ludwig von Mülinen (1521-1597) purchased the castle in 1570 and gave half to Hans Rudolf Steiger (1549-1577) six years later.

== Von Wurstemberger library ==
In June 2011 a decision was made by the director Jürg StüssiLauterburg of the Library am Guisanplatz (BiG), a federal military library in Bern, to purchase a historical collection of items from the Von Wurstemberger family. The collection of items had been collected and exhibited in the Wittigkofen Castle. The collection included a large library, maps, and a portrait of Johann Ludwig Von Wurstemberger, a cabinet, and drawings. The Von Wurstemberger library was located in the French room of the castle and contained many books that reflected the impact that this family had on the Confederation's military history. Before being packed for transfer, every book was thoroughly cleaned with a special vacuum to avoid bringing insects to their new location. The books were packed into 50 removal boxes for transfer to the Library am Guisanplatz, with the help of active military personnel, and moved to their new location in September 2011.

== See also ==
- List of castles in Switzerland
