= City Church of Biel =

- Stadtkirche Biel
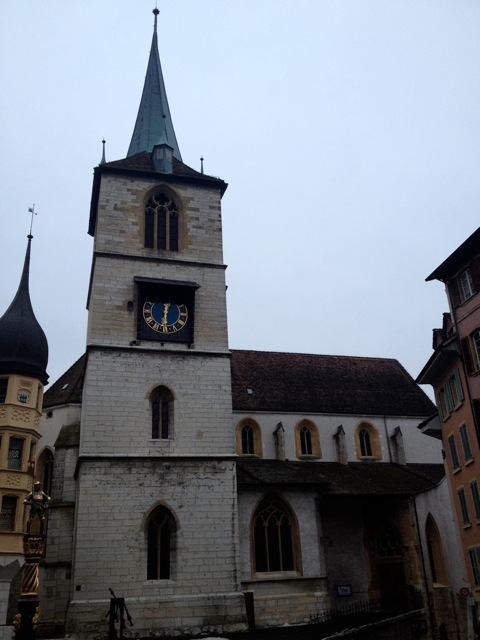
- The City Church in Biel

- 47°8′29″N 7°14′47″E
- Location: Biel/Bienne, Canton of Bern
- Country: Switzerland
- Denomination: Swiss Reformed
- Previous denomination: Roman Catholic
- Website: www.ref-biel.ch

History
- Former name: Church of St. Benedict
- Status: Parish church
- Founded: 1451

Architecture
- Functional status: Active
- Heritage designation: Swiss Inventory of Cultural Property of National and Regional Significance
- Architect: Wenzlin from Bohemia
- Architectural type: Basilica
- Style: Gothic
- Completed: 1470

Specifications
- Length: 36 m (118 ft)
- Height: 14 m (46 ft)

The City Church of Biel (German: Stadtkirche Biel) is a Swiss Reformed church in Biel/Bienne, Switzerland. Built in the Gothic style, its construction started around 1451 and was mostly complete in 1470. The church is considered one of the most significant late-Gothic churches in Switzerland and is a Swiss Cultural Property of National Significance.

== History ==
The current church was built on the site of two earlier churches, a Romanesque building and an early Gothic building. Very little is known of the previous churches, though the old sacristy now forms a crypt below the choir. The town of Biel first appears in records between 1225 and 1230 while one of the earlier churches is first mentioned in 1228. This and the current church were dedicated to St. Benedict. In 1367, much of the town, including the church, was destroyed in a fire. Construction began on the current church in 1451 under the leadership of the master builder Wenzlin of Bohemia, who remained on the site until his death in 1465. Primary construction finished up about 5 years later in 1470. The tower of the previous Gothic church had to be repaired and strengthened and was incorporated into the new building. In 1480 additional height was added to bring the bells above the new roof. However, while finishing construction a wall collapsed. The top of the tower, the bells and an unlucky worker all fell into the street below. Master builder Henmann Ulfinger spent about 10 years rebuilding the tower, finishing in 1490. In 1549 Hans Dyck replaced the old bell tower roof with a steeply pointed spire and four small spires, a design which remains today. The five current bells were added in the 19th and 20th centuries; three in 1882, one in 1947 and one in 1955. The church was partly rebuilt in the Baroque in 1781-83. The Baroque elements were replaced with Gothic Revival elements in 1864-84 under the direction of Hans Rycher. The Gothic Revival elements were removed and the original Gothic design and decoration were repaired in 1908-11 by Emanuel Jirka Propper.

== The building exterior ==
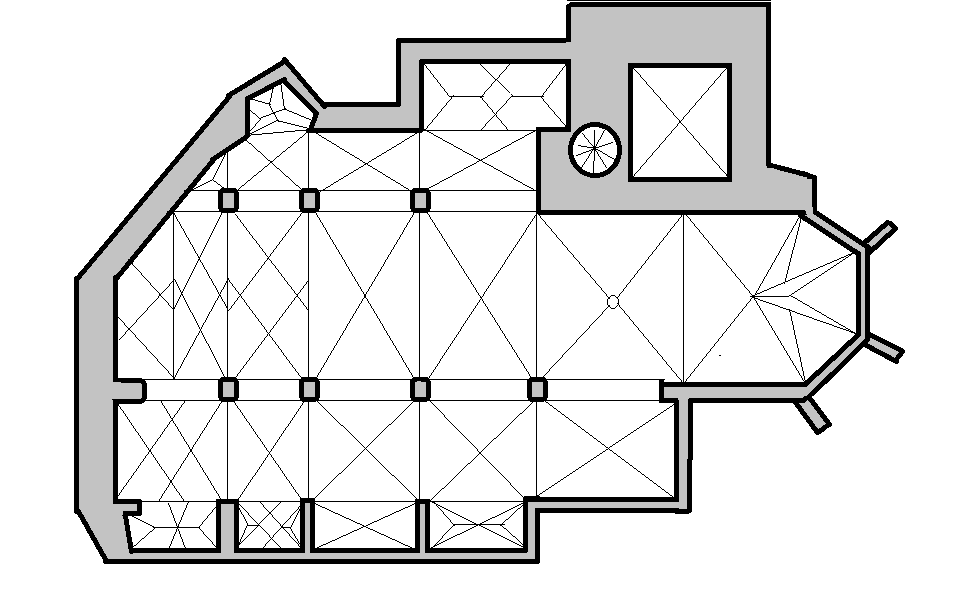
Floor plan of the church

The church is an uneven, mostly rectangular, sharply beveled on the north-west corner basilica. It lacks a crossing and transepts. The polygonal choir and nave share a single roof and there are side chapels between the buttresses on the south side. The massive tower makes up the north-east corner. The western portal is partly interrupted by the beveled north-west corner and so has an asymmetric arraignment of a pointed arch portal and windows.

== The interior ==
The church has a central nave with two uneven side aisles and four side chapels. The nave is divided into four bays, supported by large octagonal capital-less pillars. The roof in the eastern (and older) part of the church is supported by rib vaults while the western part has lierne vaults. The wall behind the choir is pierced with three high pointed arch windows. The windows are filled with 15th century stained glass which depict events from the life of St. Benedict. The nave and choir together are 36 meters (118 ft) long, 7.5 m (25 ft) wide and 14 m (46 ft) high.

== Organs ==
=== Main organ ===
This Baroque organ was built by Jacques Besancon above the western portal. It was first played on 20 September 1783 and was damaged in the 25 July 1855 earthquake. Twenty years later, in 1875, it was finally repaired and put back in service. It was repaired, cleaned and partly rebuilt in 1902 and again in 1943. At that time, the organ had more than 55 registers, distributed over three manuals and pedals. In 2011 it was repaired by the Metzler Orgel company and put back into service. After the 2011 work, the organ has a total of 51 registers, including an extended register and a transmission, on four manuals and a pedal. A special feature is the 4th manual, called the Winddynamisches Werk.

I Hauptwerk C–g^{3}
1.	Praestant	16′
2.	Octave	8′
3.	Viola	8′
4.	Flûte harmonique	8′
5.	Hohlflöte	8′
6.	Octave	4′
7.	Spitzflöte	4′
8.	Quinte	2^{2}/_{3}′
9.	Superoctave	2′
10.	Cornet V	8′
11.	Mixtur IV	1^{1}/_{3}′
12.	Fagott	16′
13.	Trompete	8′

II Positiv C–g^{3}
14.	Quintade	8′
15.	Rohrflöte	8′
16.	Principal	4′
17.	Gemshorn	4′
18.	Kleingedackt	4′
19.	Sesquialter II	2^{2}/_{3}′
20.	Octave	2′
21.	Larigot	1^{1}/_{3}′
22.	Scharf IV	1′
23.	Dulcian	8′
	Tremulant

III Schwellwerk C–g^{3}
24.	Gedackt	16′
25.	Principal	8′
26.	Gambe	8′
27.	Voix céleste	8′
28.	Holzflöte	8′
29.	Principal	4′
30.	Traversflöte	4′
31.	Nasard	2^{2}/_{3}′
32.	Waldflöte	2′
33.	Terz	1^{3}/_{5}′
34.	Sifflet	1′
35.	Trompette harmonique	8′
36.	Oboe	8′
37.	Clairon	4′
	Tremulant

IV Winddynamisches Werk F–f^{2}
38.	Flauto	8′
39.	Octave	4′
40.	Quintade	2^{2}/_{3}′
41.	Terzade	1^{3}/_{5}′
42.	Windharfe	4′

Pedalwerk C–f^{1}
43.	Subbass (aus Nr. 45)	32′
44.	Holzprincipal	16′
45.	Subbass	16′
46.	Octavbass	8′
47.	Viola (= Nr. 3)	8′
48.	Choralbass	4′
49.	Rauschpfeife IV	2′
50.	Posaune	16′
51.	Trompete	8′

- Koppeln: II/I, III/I, III/II, I/P, II/P, III/P

=== Swallow's nest organ ===
A Swallow's nest organ, built in 1994 by Metzler Orgelbau (Dietikon), is located on the north wall of the church. It replaces the 1517 swallow's nest organ which was built by Hans Tugi and was destroyed in rioting during the Reformation in 1527. Today's instrument has nine registers, Rückpositiv (FGAB-g^{2}a ^{2}: Gedackt 8', Principal 4') and Manual (CDEFGAB-g^{2}a^{2}: Praestant 8', Coppel 8', Octave 4', Waldflöte 2', Mixtur IV, Sesquialtera II, Regal 8'). The pedal (CDEFGAB-c^{1}) is attached to the manual. The instrument is equipped with a Tremulant as well as the effect registers Vogelgesang, Zimbelglöcklein as well as with a Kalkantenglocke. It is medium-toned and is designed especially for the performance of organ music of Late Gothic, the Renaissance and the Early Baroque. The painted wing doors were completed in 1995.
