= Holligen Castle =

Castle in Bern, Switzerland

- Schloss Holligen
- Bern in Switzerland
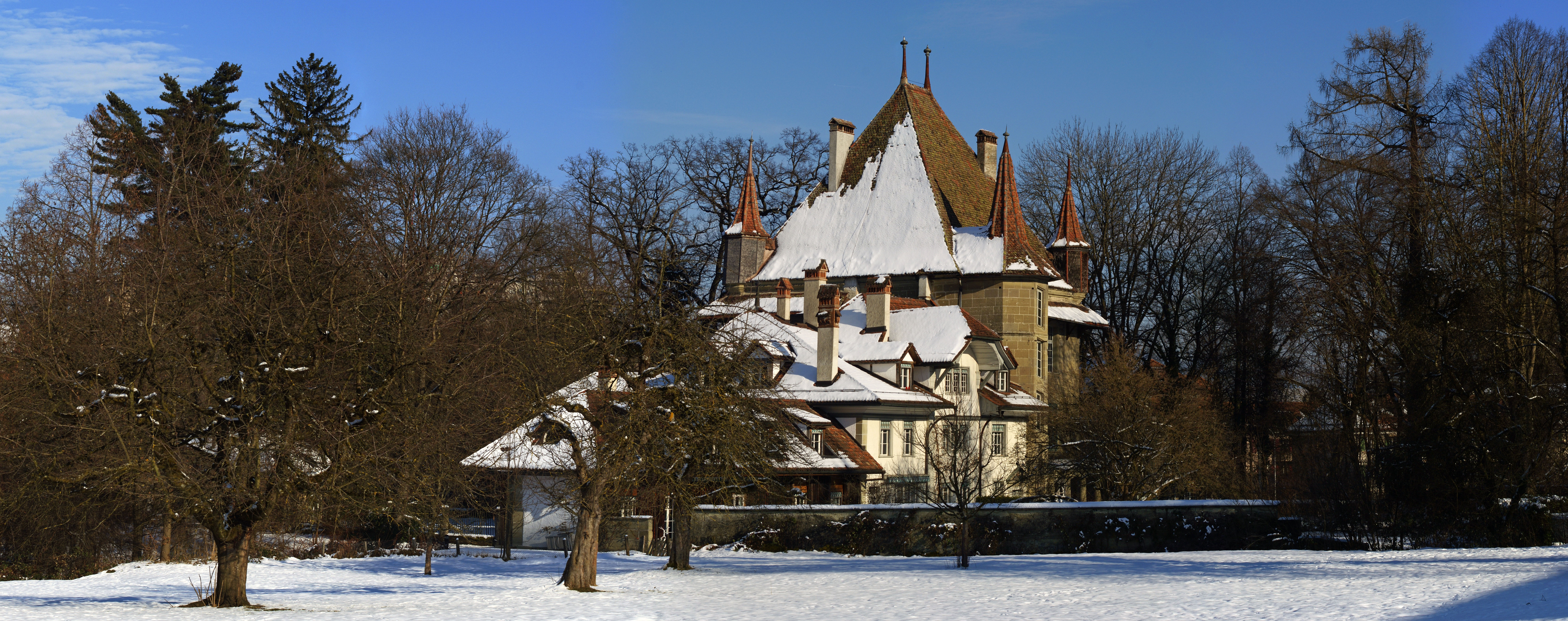
- Holligen Castle

Site information
- Type: Castle
- Website: http://www.schlossholligen.ch

Location
- Coordinates: 46°56′37″N 7°25′07″E

Site history
- Built: around 1500
- Built by: Wilhelm von Diesbach
- Materials: Sandstone blocks

Holligen Castle is a castle in the municipality of Bern of the Canton of Bern in Switzerland. It is a Swiss heritage site of national significance.

== History ==
The first recorded mention of Holligen is in 1257, when it was owned by the Teutonic Knights commandry of Köniz. It is likely that there was a castle here to control the Bümpliz-Köniz road and administer the estates. However, very little is known of this building. The current castle was built around 1500 by the Bernese Schultheiss Wilhelm von Diesbach. It was built in the style of a typical Burgundian castle, with a square donjon of massive stone blocks with four towers at the corners. A residential hall with a staircase tower was added around 1575 for Peter von Graffenried.

A map by Thomas Schöpf from 1577 and a city plan from 1623/24 both show the castle surrounded by a ring wall with several small towers. Between the 1624 plan and 1667, the square castle was expanded with the construction and expansion of the residential hall to the west. In the 18th century the castle was renovated in the Baroque style. The facade and windows were redone in 1765. The second story was renovated into an enormous great hall, about 14 m × 12.5 m × 5.6 m (46 ft × 41 ft × 18 ft) in size.

Between 1991 and 1994 the castle was extensively renovated and repaired. Today it is owned by the Turmstiftung Schloss Holligen, a foundation that maintains the castle.

== See also ==
- List of castles in Switzerland
