= Münsterplatz (Bern) =

Plaza in the Old City of Bern

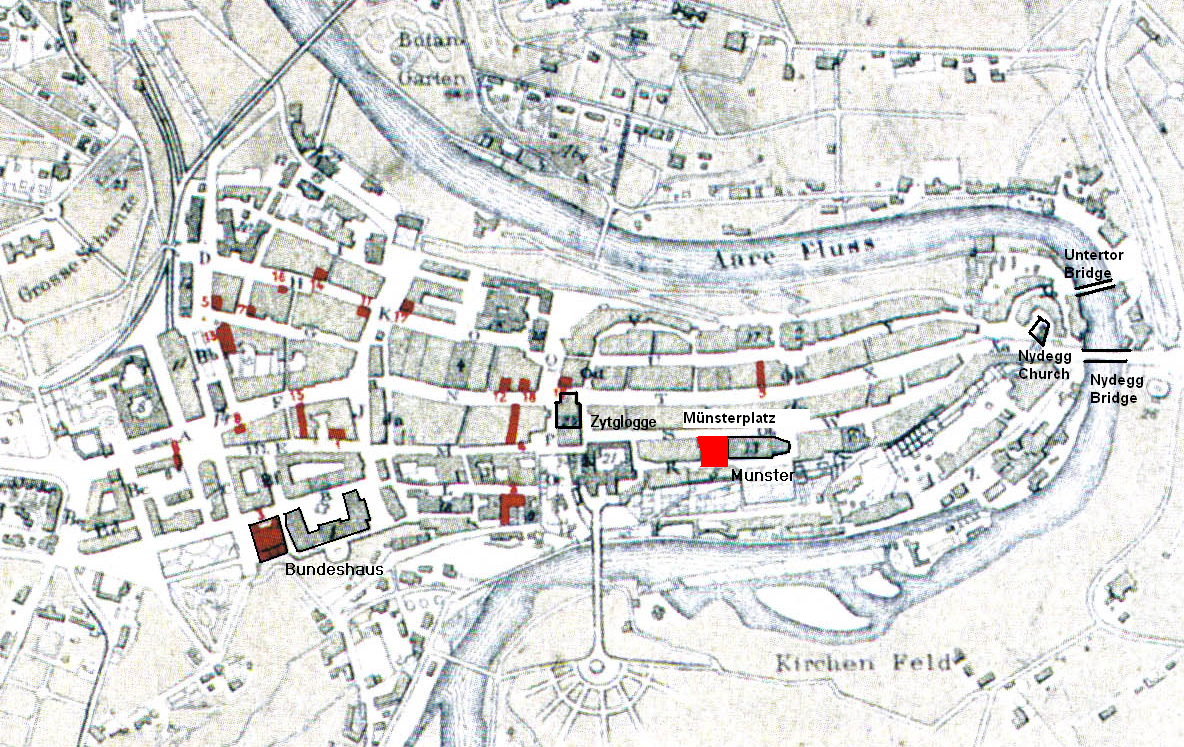
- Old City of Bern with Münsterplatz highlighted
- Location: Old City of Bern, Bern, Switzerland
- Postal code: 3011
- Coordinates: 46°56′50.08″N 7°27′3″E

Construction
- Construction start: 1430

The Münsterplatz (Swiss Standard German pronunciation: [ˈmʏnstərˌplats]) is a plaza in the Old City of Bern, the medieval city center of Bern, Switzerland. It is part of the Zähringerstadt which was built during the foundation of the old city in 1191. It is located in front of the Cathedral and it is part of the UNESCO Cultural World Heritage Site that encompasses the Old City.

== History ==
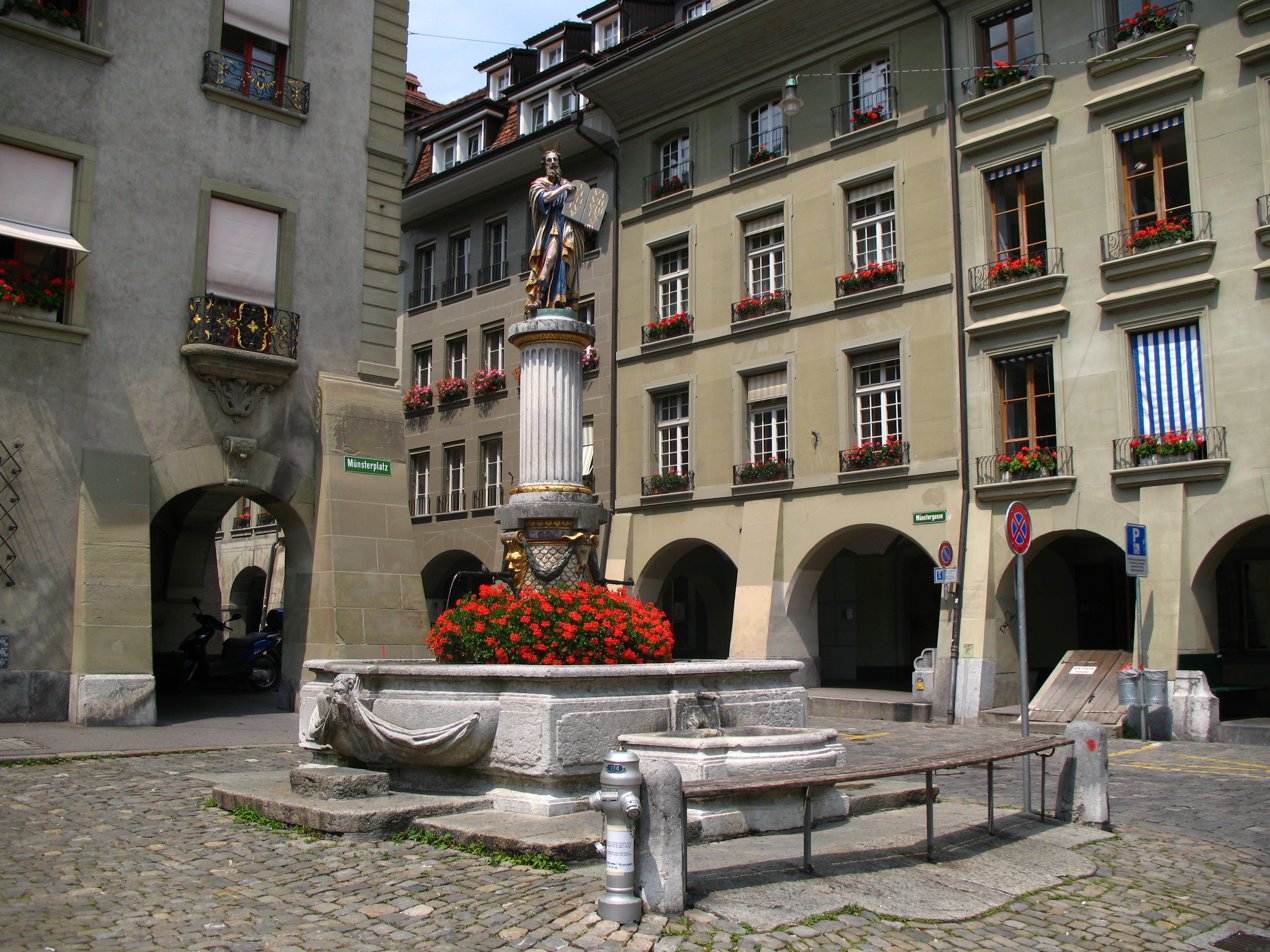
Münsterplatz

On 11 March 1421 construction began on the cathedral of Bern. Nine years later, in 1430, the church yard of St. Vinzenzen's Church was demolished to make way for a grand plaza in front of the new cathedral. At some time before 1506, two houses on Herrengasse were demolished to allow the plaza to expand westward. It expanded again, at some time before 1528, when three houses in what would become Münstergasse were demolished. The name Münsterplatz was commonly used in the 19th century and became official in 1881.
