= Anna-Seiler-Brunnen =

Fountain in Bern, Switzerland

Coordinates: 46.948185°N 7.444522°E

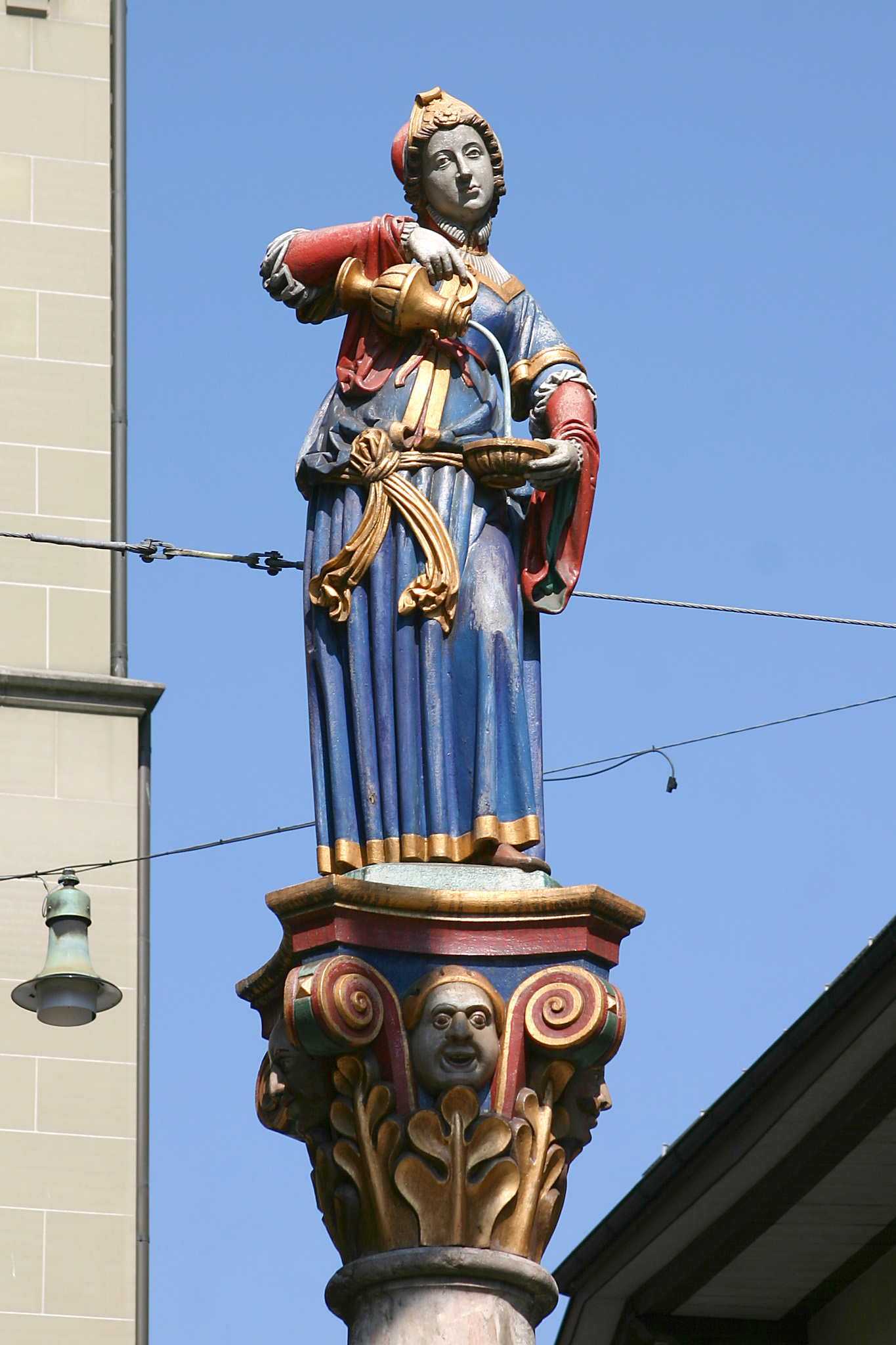
Statue of Anna Seiler, founder of Bern's hospital in 1354.

The Anna-Seiler-Brunnen (Anna Seiler Fountain) is a fountain on Marktgasse in the Old City of Bern, Switzerland. It is a Swiss Cultural Property of National Significance and is part of the UNESCO World Heritage Site of the Old City of Bern.

== History ==
The fountain, located at the upper end of Marktgasse memorializes the founder of the first hospital in Bern. Anna Seiler is represented by a woman in a blue dress, pouring water into a small dish. She stands on a pillar brought from the Roman town of Aventicum (modern Avenches). On 29 November 1354 in her will she asked the city to help found a hospital in her house which today stands on Zeughausgasse. The hospital initially had 13 beds and 2 attendants and was to be an ewiges Spital or a perpetual hospital. When Anna died around 1360 the hospital was renamed the Seilerin Spital. In 1531 the hospital moved to the empty Dominican Order monastery St. Michaels Insel (St. Michael's Island) and was then known as the Inselspital, which still exists over 650 years after Anna Seiler founded it. The modern Inselspital has about 6,000 employees and treats about 220,000 individuals per year.
