= Simsonbrunnen =

Fountain in Bern, Switzerland

Coordinates: 46.947932°N 7.450406°E

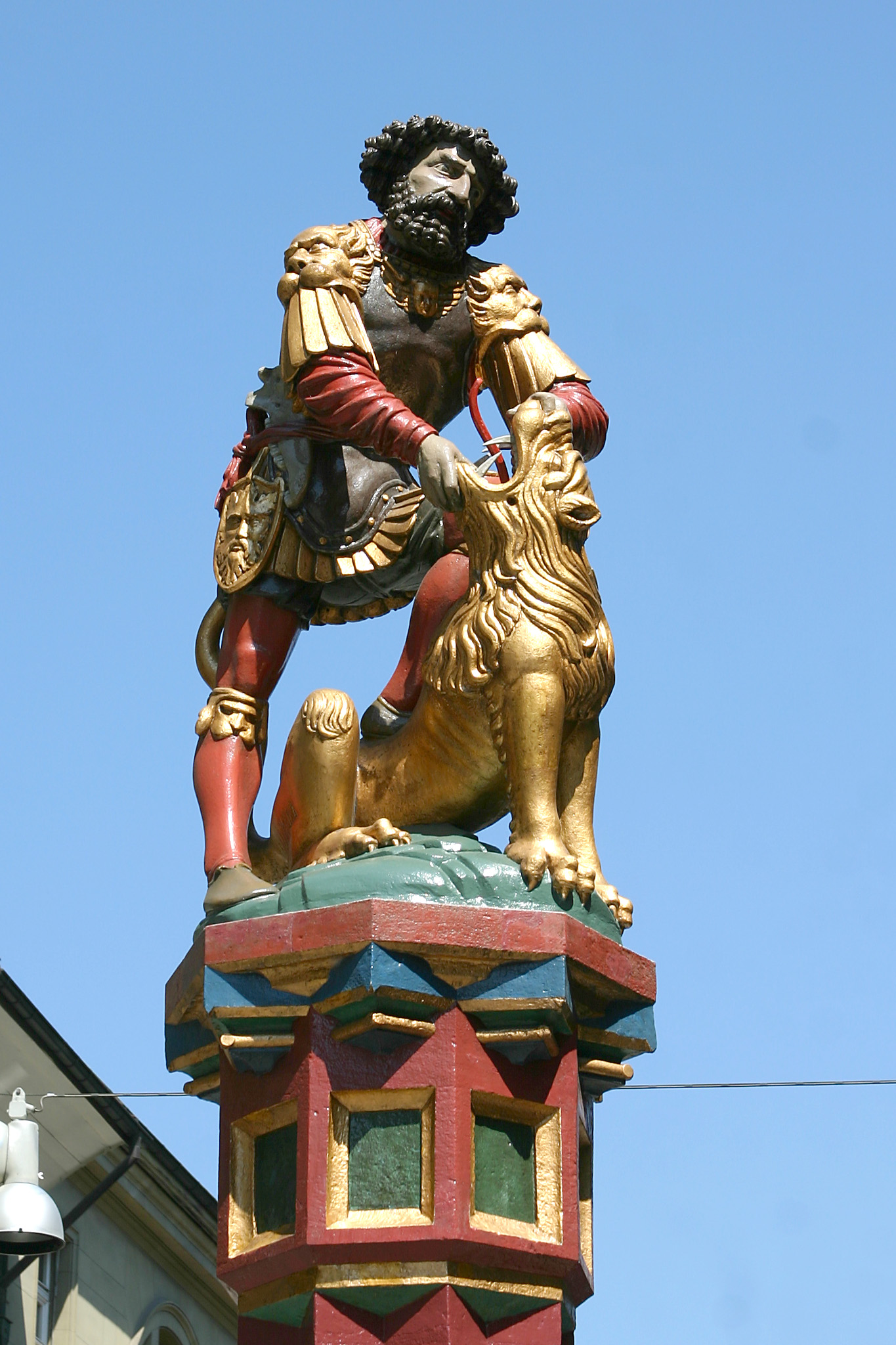
Samson killing a lion.

The Simsonbrunnen or Samson fountain is a fountain on the Kramgasse in the Old City of Bern, Switzerland. It is a Swiss Cultural Property of National Significance and is part of the UNESCO World Heritage Site of the Old City of Bern.

== History ==
The fountain represents the biblical story of Samson killing a lion found in Judges 14:5–20. According to the story, Samson was born to a sterile Israelite couple on the conditions that his mother and her child (Samson) abstain from all alcohol and that he never shave nor cut his hair. Because of his commitment to live under these conditions, Samson is granted great strength. As a young man he falls in love with a Philistine woman and decides to marry her. At this time, the Philistines ruled over the Israelites and Samson's decision to marry one causes great concern among his family. He calms their concerns and travels to marry his love. On the way he is attacked by the lion and with his incredible strength kills the lion. Later, he sees that bees have built a honeycomb in the lion's body. He uses this event as the basis of a riddle, which when not answered, gives him a pretext to attack the Philistines and lead an unsuccessful rebellion.

The fountain, built in 1544 by Hans Gieng, is modeled after the Simsonbrunnen in Solothurn.
