= Vennerbrunnen =

Fountain in Bern, Switzerland

Coordinates: 46.948418°N 7.45239°E

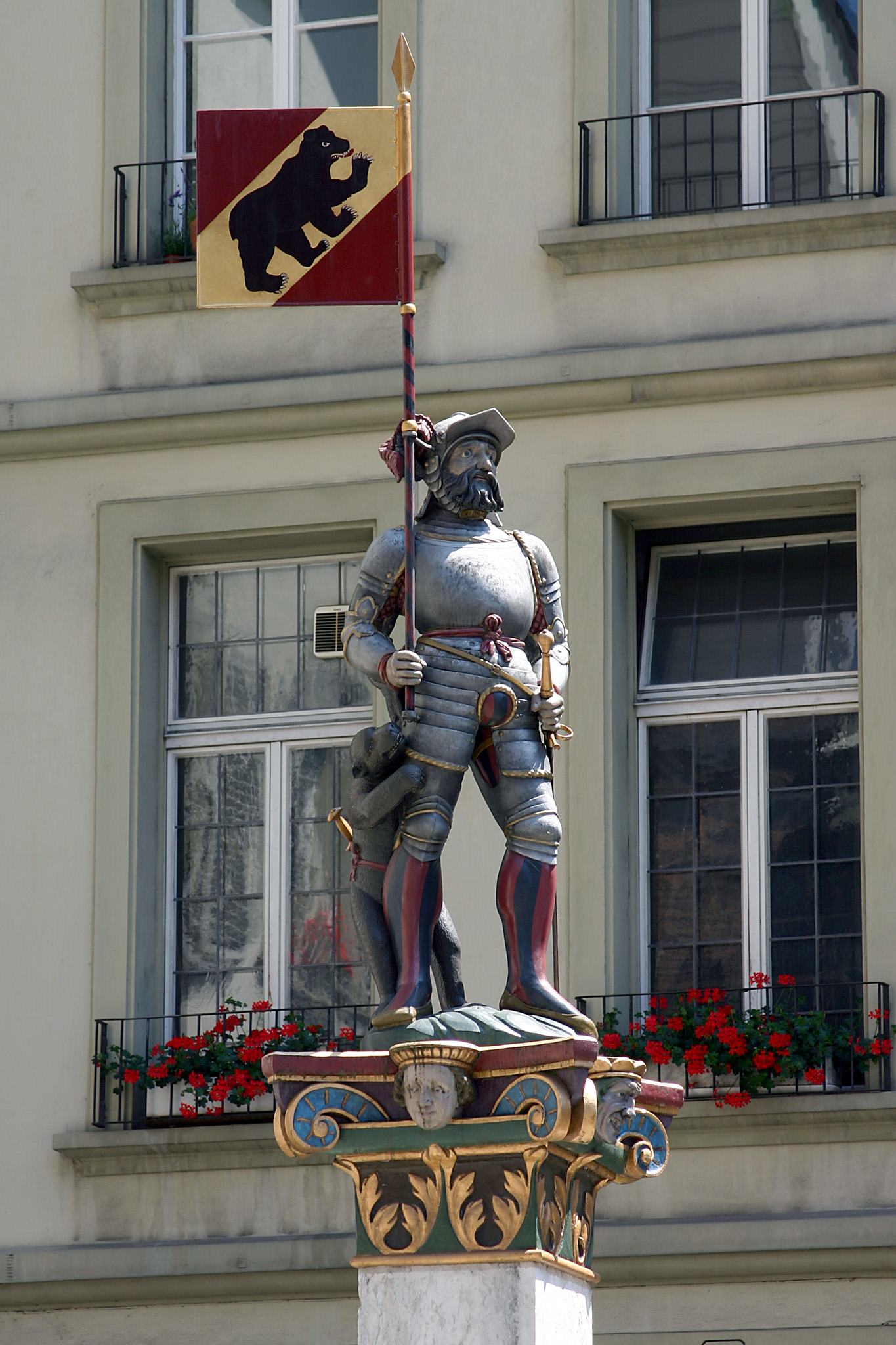
Vennerbrunnen.

The Vennerbrunnen (Banner Carrier or Vexillum Fountain) is a fountain on Rathausplatz in the Old City of Bern, Switzerland. It is a Swiss Cultural Property of National Significance and is part of the UNESCO World Heritage Site of the Old City of Bern.

== History ==
The fountain is located in front of the old city hall or Rathaus. The Venner was military-political title in medieval Switzerland. He was responsible for peace and protection in a section of a city and then to lead troops from that section in battle. In Bern the Venner was a very powerful position and was key in city's operations. Each Venner was connected to a guild and chosen from the guild. Venner was one of only two positions from which the Schultheiß or Lord Mayor was chosen. The statue, built in 1542 shows a Venner in full armor with his banner.
