= Läuferbrunnen =

Fountain in Bern, Switzerland

Coordinates: 46.949722°N 7.457778°E

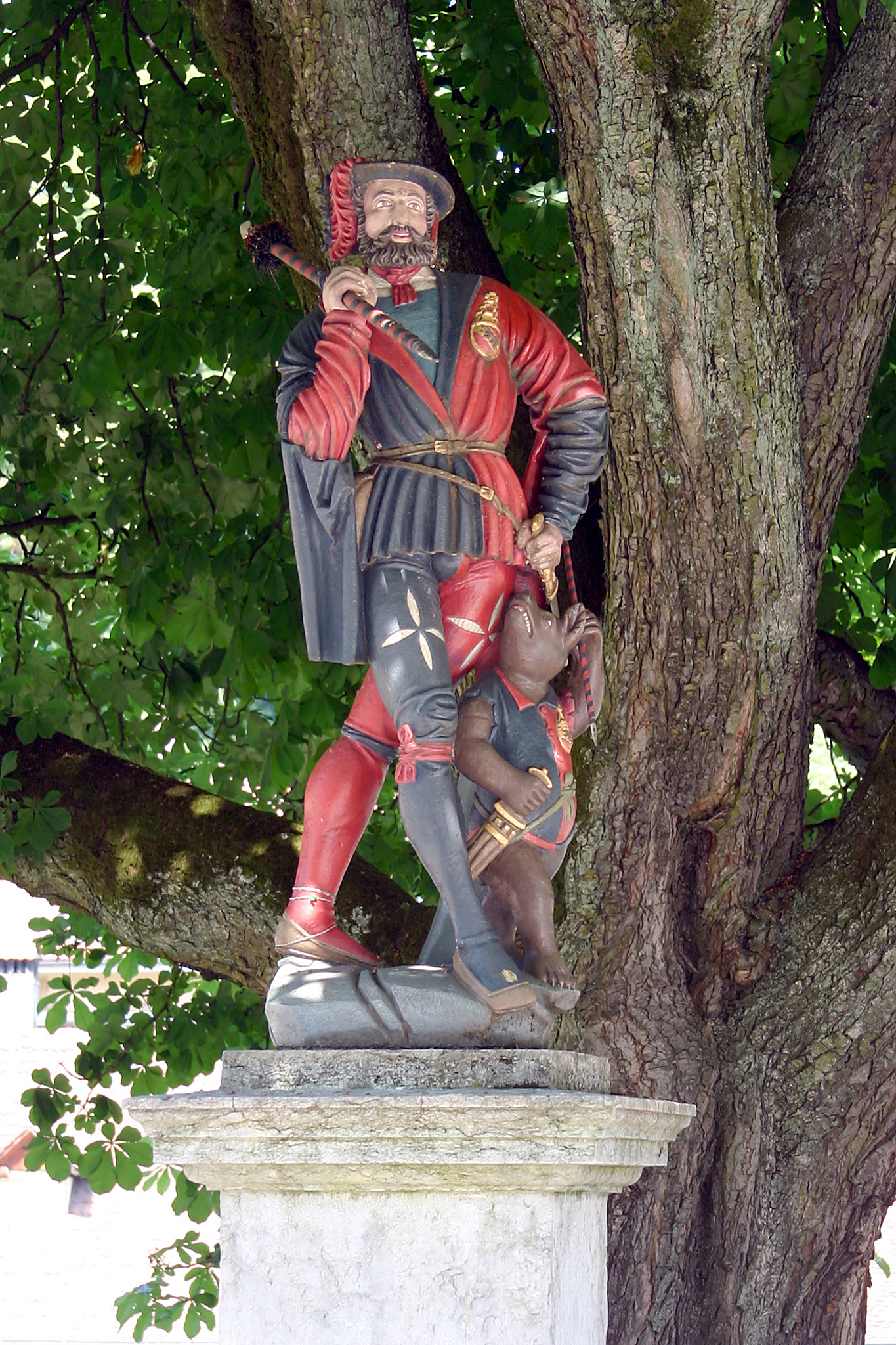
Läuferbrunnen.

The Läuferbrunnen (Runner Fountain) is a fountain on Läuferplatz in the Old City of Bern, Switzerland. It is a Swiss Cultural Property of National Significance and is part of the UNESCO World Heritage Site of the Old City of Bern.

== History ==
It is located near the Nydegg Church on Nydeggstalden. The trough was built in 1824, but the figure dates from 1545. The Runner has moved several times since its creation, and until about 1663 was known as the Brunnen beim unteren Tor (Fountain by the lower gate). Originally the Läuferbrunnen had an octagonal trough and a tall, round column. The trough was replaced with a rectangular trough before 1757 which was replaced in 1824. The round column was replaced with the current square limestone pillar in the 18th or 19th century.
