= Herrengasse (Bern) =

Street in Bern, Switzerland

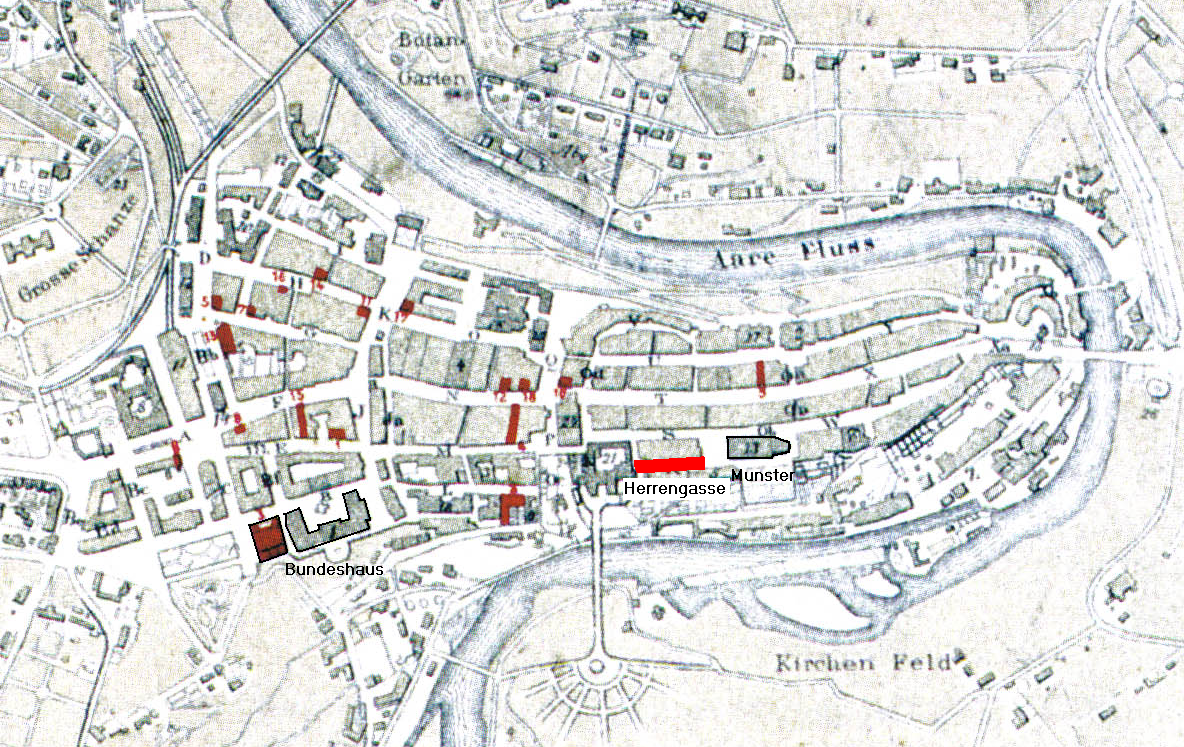
- Old City of Bern with Herrengasse highlighted
- Former name(s): vicus de Egerdon herrengass von Egerdon
- Length: 200 m (660 ft)
- Location: Old City of Bern, Bern, Switzerland
- Postal code: 3011
- Coordinates: 46.94705°N 7.4495°E

The Herrengasse ("Nobles' Lane") is one of the streets in the Old City of Bern, the medieval city center of Bern, Switzerland. It was the southernmost street of the old Zähringerstadt (Zähringer town) of Bern and ended at the first city wall. Three buildings on the Herrengasse are listed on the Swiss inventory of heritage site of national significance and it is part of the UNESCO Cultural World Heritage Site that encompasses the Old City.

== Topography ==
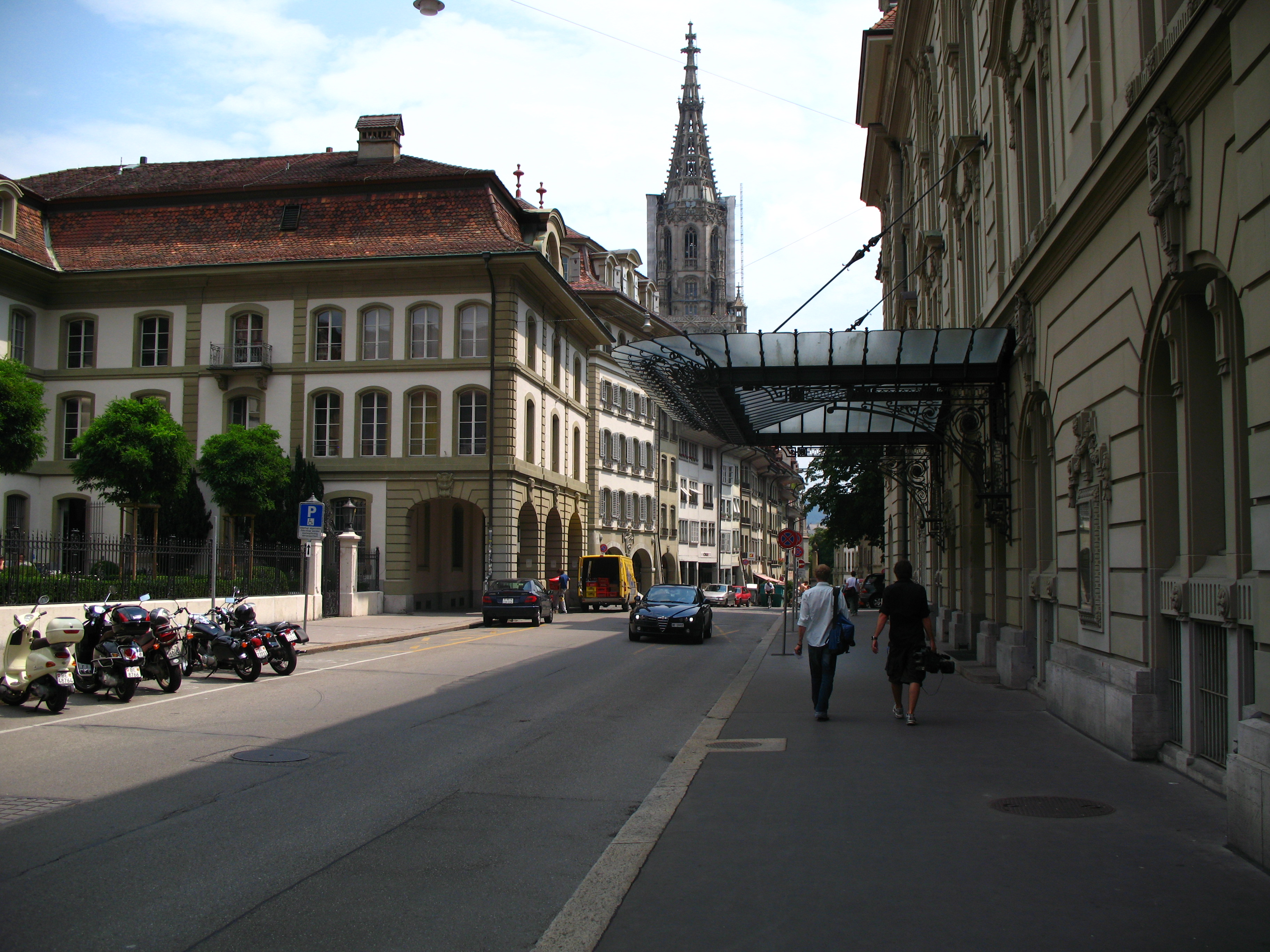
Herrengasse from Casinoplatz looking toward the Münster of Bern (Cathedral). Showing both the Sonnseite (Sunny Side) and Schattseite (Shady Side) of the street

Herrengasse, like most streets in the Old City, runs east to west. However due to the increasing width of the Aare peninsula the street only runs a short distance from the Münsterplatz (the plaza in front of the Münster of Bern) to the Casinoplatz. The Herrengasse is divided into 2 sections along the center of the street. The Sonnseite (Sunny Side) was originally the southern flank of the 1191 Zähringerstadt. The Schattseite (Shady Side) was built later as the original city expanded within the city walls from 1191. In addition to the division along the street, there is also a division in the middle of the street. Along both sides of the street there are two separate rows of buildings, with a small passageway between them which runs north and south. South of the Herrengasse the Aare peninsula drops away sharply toward the Aare. Near the Herrengasse, at Casinoplatz, the modern Kirchenfeld Bridge crosses the river to the heights of Kirchenfeld.

== Notable residents ==
Herrengasse 23 was occupied by Allen Dulles who was the Chief of Station for OSS in Switzerland during World War II. From his house on Herrengasse he ran an intelligence organization that produced information on Nazi aircraft, V-1 and V-2 missiles, the 20 July 1944 attempt to kill Hitler, and even the surrender of German troops in Italy.
