= List of towers in Bern =

This is a list of towers in Bern. As the city of Bern in Switzerland grew, gatehouse towers and other defensive towers were built. Many of the towers have been rebuilt multiple times and served many different purposes over the centuries since Bern's founding.

For more information on the history of the UNESCO Cultural World Heritage Site of Bern, see Old City of Bern.

Image	Name	Year built	Year demolished	Height	Street/Square	Coordinates	Notes
Blutturm	Blutturm						
Christoffelturm	Christoffelturm	1344 and 1346	1865		Spitalgasse		Demolished to make room for train station.
Dittlingerturm	Dittlingerturm						
Felsenburg	Felsenburg	1260–1270			Klösterlisturz 2		
Holländerturm	Holländerturm	1230 or early 17th Century			Waisenhausplatz 15		The exact age of the tower is unclear. The name means Dutch tower and refers to a Bernese mercenary commander who bought the tower after service in Holland.
Innere Aarbergertor	Innere Aarbergertor						
Käfigturm	Käfigturm	1256 rebuilt 1642–1645	first tower 1640	49 m (161 ft)	Marktgasse		First tower demolished in 1640. Second tower started in 1642. Name means prison or cage tower.
Zytglogge	Zytglogge	1218–1220		54.5 m (179 ft)	Kramgasse		Name means clock tower. Features a large clock, a smaller astronomical clock and moving figures.
