= Bear pit (disambiguation) =

A bear pit is an enclosure used to display bears, often for entertainment and bear-baiting.

Bear pit, or Bear Pit, may also refer to:

- Bear Pit (novel), a 2000 novel by Australian author Jon Cleary
- The Bearpit, Bristol, a roundabout and open space
- Bärengraben, a specific notable bear pit in the Swiss city of Bern

== See also ==
- Berenkuil (disambiguation), Dutch for bear pit
