= Berenkuil =

Berenkuil, Dutch for "bear pit", may refer to:

- Berenkuil (traffic), a type of traffic circle with a separate ring for bicycles
- Berenkuil, Eindhoven, a traffic circle in Eindhoven, Netherlands

== See also ==
- Bear pit (disambiguation)
