= Step in the Arena (disambiguation) =

Step in the Arena may refer to:

- Step in the Arena, an album by Gang Starr
- "Step in the Arena" (Luke Cage), an episode of Luke Cage
- Step in The Arena (festival)
