= Hans von Rüte =

Bernese dramatist

Hans von Rüte (died 23 March 1558) was a Bernese dramatist and chronicler of the Swiss Reformation. His plays for the Bernese Fasnacht are important contemporary sources for Swiss historiography of the mid-16th century.

== Biography ==
Von Rüte is recorded as acquiring Bernese citizenship in 1528. In the same year he married the former nun Cathrin Hetzel von Lindnach. His origin and earlier biography is unknown. He has variously been identified as a native of Emmental, Solothurn, Aarau or Berne itself. In 1531 he was elected into the city council. In 1545 he was found guilty of adultery and lost his office as scrivener, which he was granted again, however, in 1546. In 1555 he was made bailiff at Zofingen, where he died in 1558.

== Works ==
Von Rüte's plays are based on biblical narratives. He mocks the Catholic veneration of saints as idolatry, likening the Protestant Reformation to the fight against Canaanite idolatry in the Hebrew Bible. Six plays were printed. A modern edition in three volumes was prepared in 2000.

- Fasznachtspiel (Abgötterei, performed 1531, printed 1532)
- Joseph (1538)
- Gedeon [Gideon] (1540)
- Noe [Noah] (1545)
- Goliath (1555)
- Osterspiel (1552)

== See also ==
- Carnival in Bern
