= Carnival in Bern =

Festival in the Swabian-Alemannic tradition

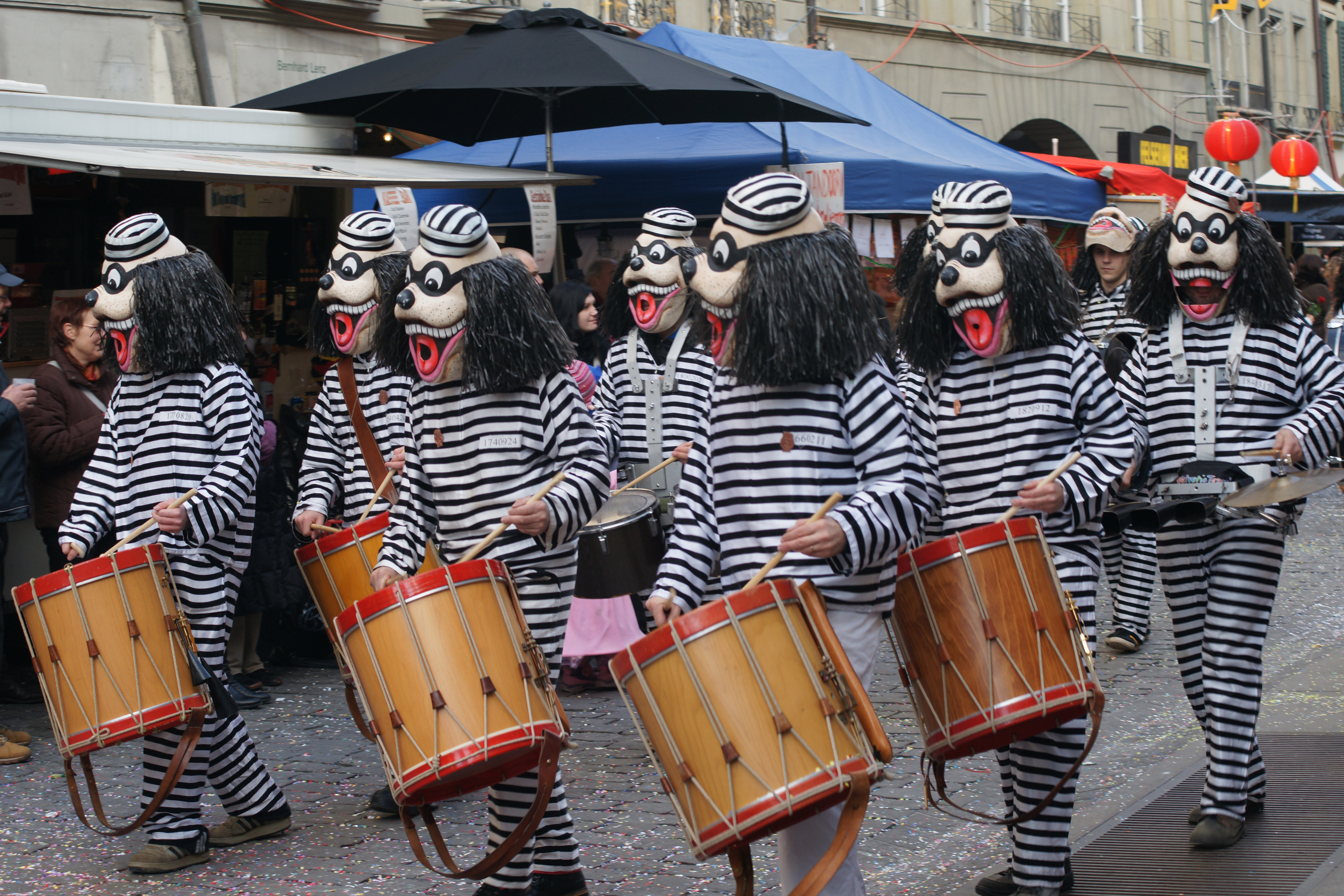
Participants in the 2010 carnival

The carnival in Bern, Switzerland (German: Berner Fasnacht) is an annual pre-Lenten festival in the Swabian-Alemannic tradition.

Its origins can be traced back to the 15th century, and in 1513 the carnival led to a peasant revolt. The Bernese carnivals were held more or less regularly in medieval times, with strong anti-Papal rhetoric occurring between 1523 and 1525. After the Peasants' War religious themes in carnivals were prohibited and did not return until the local reformation of 1528 returned freedom of speech and expression to the Protestants.

Authorities also tried to ban carnivals in later centuries. The carnival as it is known today was introduced in 1982, and is unique because it incorporates the city's history by beginning the carnival with the symbolic freeing of the bear. The carnival in Bern is the country's third largest such celebration.

== Carnival beginnings ==
Carnival was established in Bern during the medieval period. In Bern, the term for carnival is either Fasnacht or Fastnacht which means on the eve of fasting. Before the beginning of Lent, or the 40-day fasting period, feasts and folk-festivals were commonly held. During the 15th, century Bern began to grow in importance, and in the 1420s during a carnival the cornerstone for the new Rathaus was laid. The importance of the city became noticeable as visitors flocked to the city during the carnival celebrations. From the mid- to the end of the 15th century Bern saw visitors to the yearly carnival arrive from surrounding cities and Cantons such as Lucerne and as far away as from Cantons such as Schwyz.

== Carnival during the Reformation ==
During the 16th century, the Reformation caused a rift between the Protestant and Catholic citizenry of Bern, and according to scholars the city considered keeping to the Catholic Church as late as 1526; however, during this period playwrights used the opportunity to present an anti-Catholic message during the carnival (or shrovetide) Lenten celebrations. Some Reformation era carnival plays depicted contrasts between Catholics and Protestants, while others contrasted Jews and gentiles, such as in Goliath by Hans von Rüte. Niklaus Manuel was the first writer to present ideas for reform and to belittle the Papacy in his plays. In 1522 he wrote two farces about the Pope, in which he showed the difference between the Pope and his priests, and Jesus. Real life events, in particular the Battle of Novara (1513), created the backdrop for Manuel's writings. He wrote about Cardinal Anselm von Hochmuth (Haughtiness): "Mightily I have enjoyed it,/For Christian blood to me is dear,/And that's why a red hat I wear." In another Manuel play the Pope dismisses the plight of a Knight of Rhodes assisting in the war against the Turks, and declares: "No bacon to the turnips for that war, it is better to make a war with Christians."

Beginning in the mid-1520s there appear to have been incidents of sporadic violence in Bern during carnival which may have shown the tension of the Reformation period. Records show that the carnival was discontinued during the mid-to-latter half of the decade.

In the 1530s the carnival continued, but the entertainment had a different emphasis than in the earlier decade. Records show that plays with a serious religious subject were put on as early as the 1530s in Bern, with Hans von Rüte's Abgötterie (1531) possibly being the first. Hans von Rüte wrote plays about Biblical themes for the Bern carnival. In Gideon (1540) the Jews are depicted as losing to their enemies for seven devastating years because they adopted idolatry and abandoned God. Gideon eventually defeats all the enemies of the Israelites, a recurring historical theme, but first he has to destroy the altar of Ba'al. Although the story, as told in von Rüte's play, was taken from the Book of Judges and was about Jews, Rüte (as before him Manuel) meant to attack the idolatry of Catholic clerics. Von Rüte's Gideon defeats Zwinglian authority by destroying the Ba'al altar. However, in contrast to the plays of the earlier decade, von Rüte's plays show a shift away from "protestant polemics" as he eventually uses the Bernese Bear as an allegorical figure.

The tradition of Reformation era carnival theater (Fasnachtspiele) came to an end in the mid-1530s and Bernese record show that the genre came to an end by the late 1530s.

== The carnival today ==
Having been banned during the 16th century, Bern had no carnival for a long time. Instead, residents traveled to Basel or the Lucerne to enjoy carnival. In the 1970s the idea of bringing carnival back to Bern began to grow, and was first initiated with a children's carnival. In 1982 the era of the modern carnival began. Now, the Bernese Fasnacht is the third largest carnival in Switzerland although the carnivals in Basel and Lucerne have a longer or "more extravagant tradition". Carnival in Bern runs for three days in February.

== Freeing the bear ==
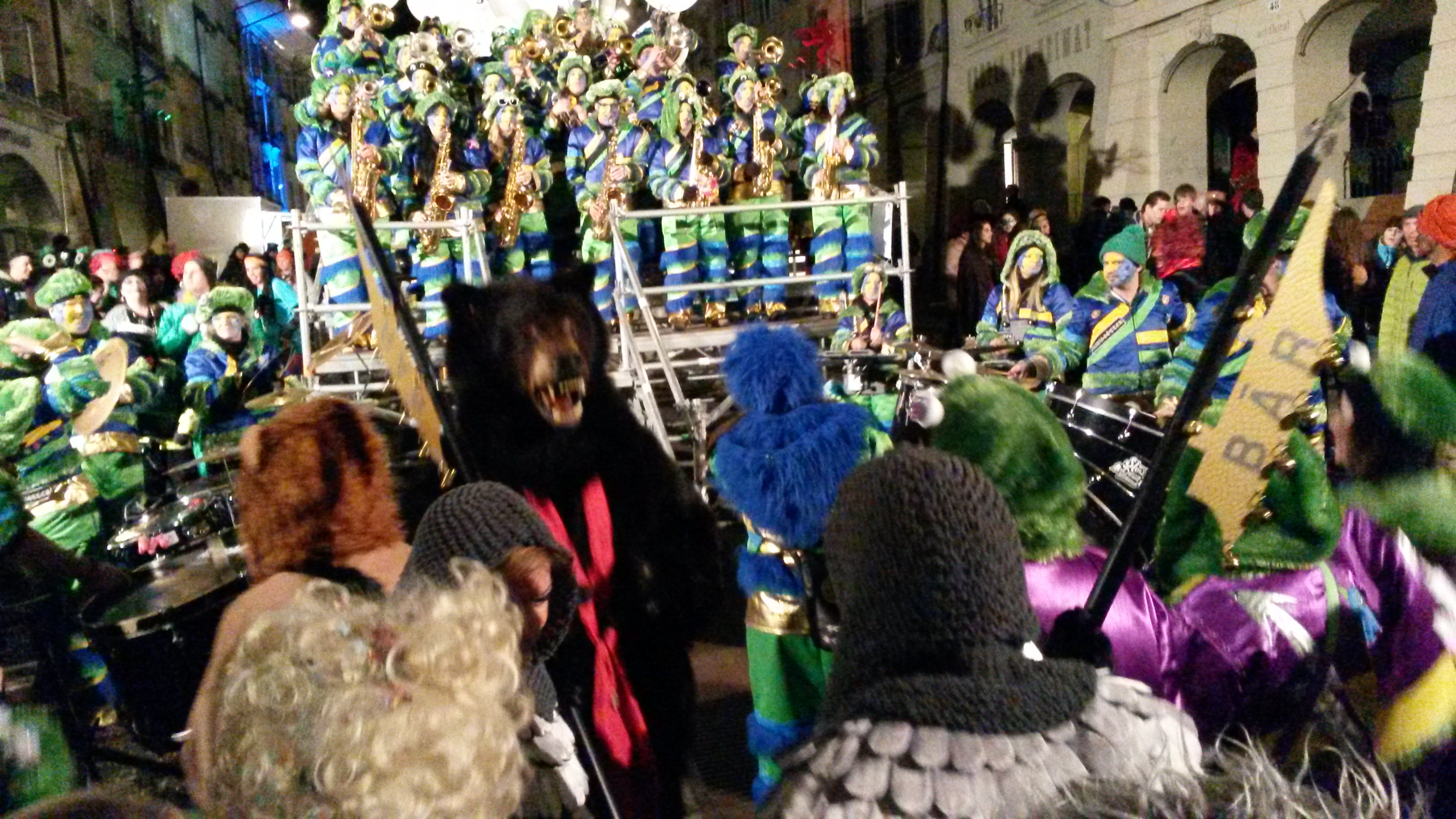
The "bear" at Berner Fasnacht 2015

According to a popular story, in 1917 Lenin, prior to the Revolution, passed by the bears in Bern, fed them carrots, and said: "The bears must be released." The carnival begins with a symbolic liberation of the bear (the participants, who are dressed as bears, wait to be liberated in the old town). Of course, the bear must first be captured. The capture takes place at 11:11 on November 11 (11/11) of the previous year. The bear spends exactly 111 days in Prison Tower for its winter sleep, before being awakened by "Ychüblete" (drumming) and released. In the 1980s, the original organizers of the modern carnival decided to use local history and to incorporate the famous bears of Bern into the modern carnival: thus they conceived of the idea of freeing the bears, thereby adding a modern idea based on the traditions of the city.

== Gallery ==
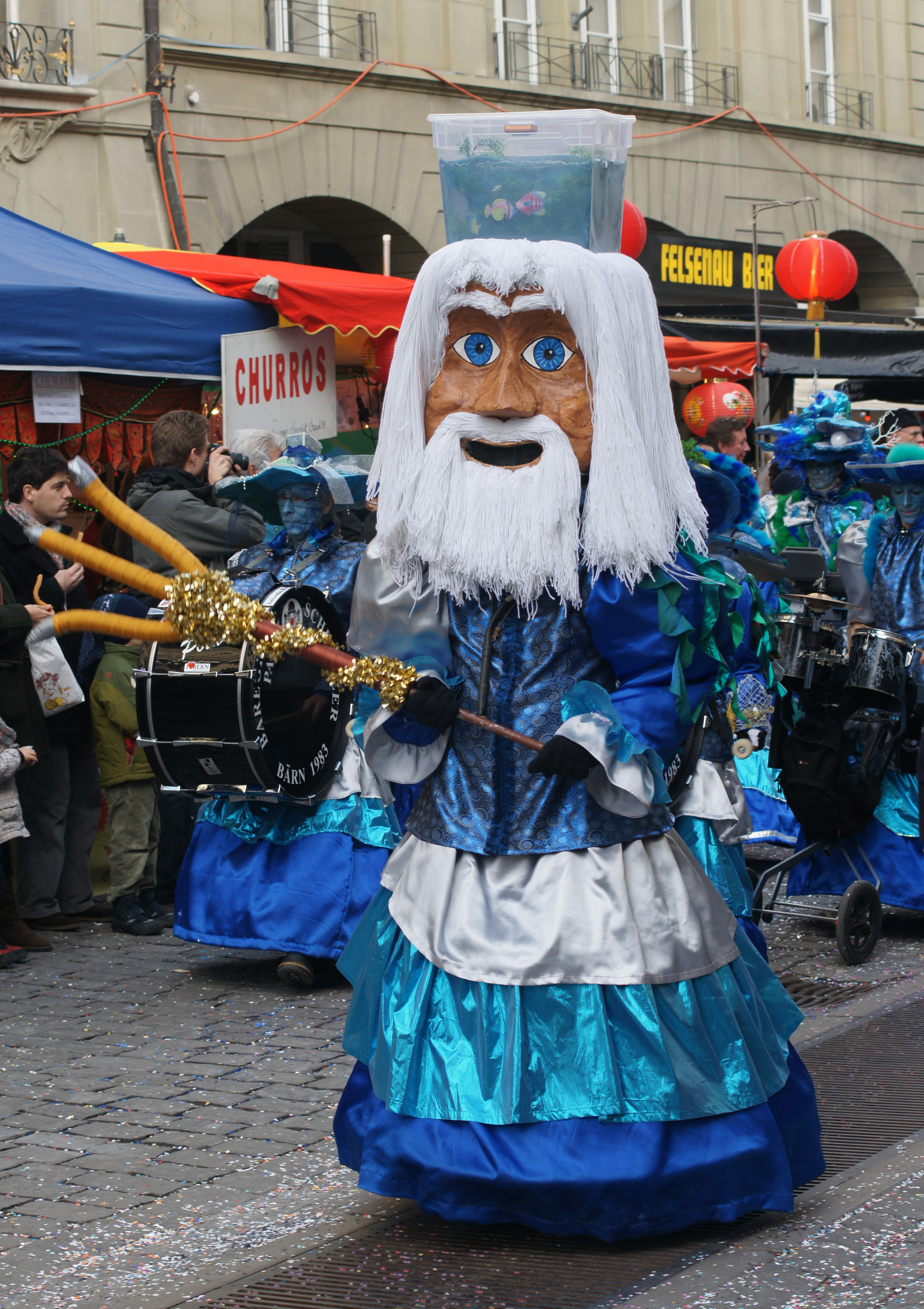
Participant in the Bernese Carnival 2010

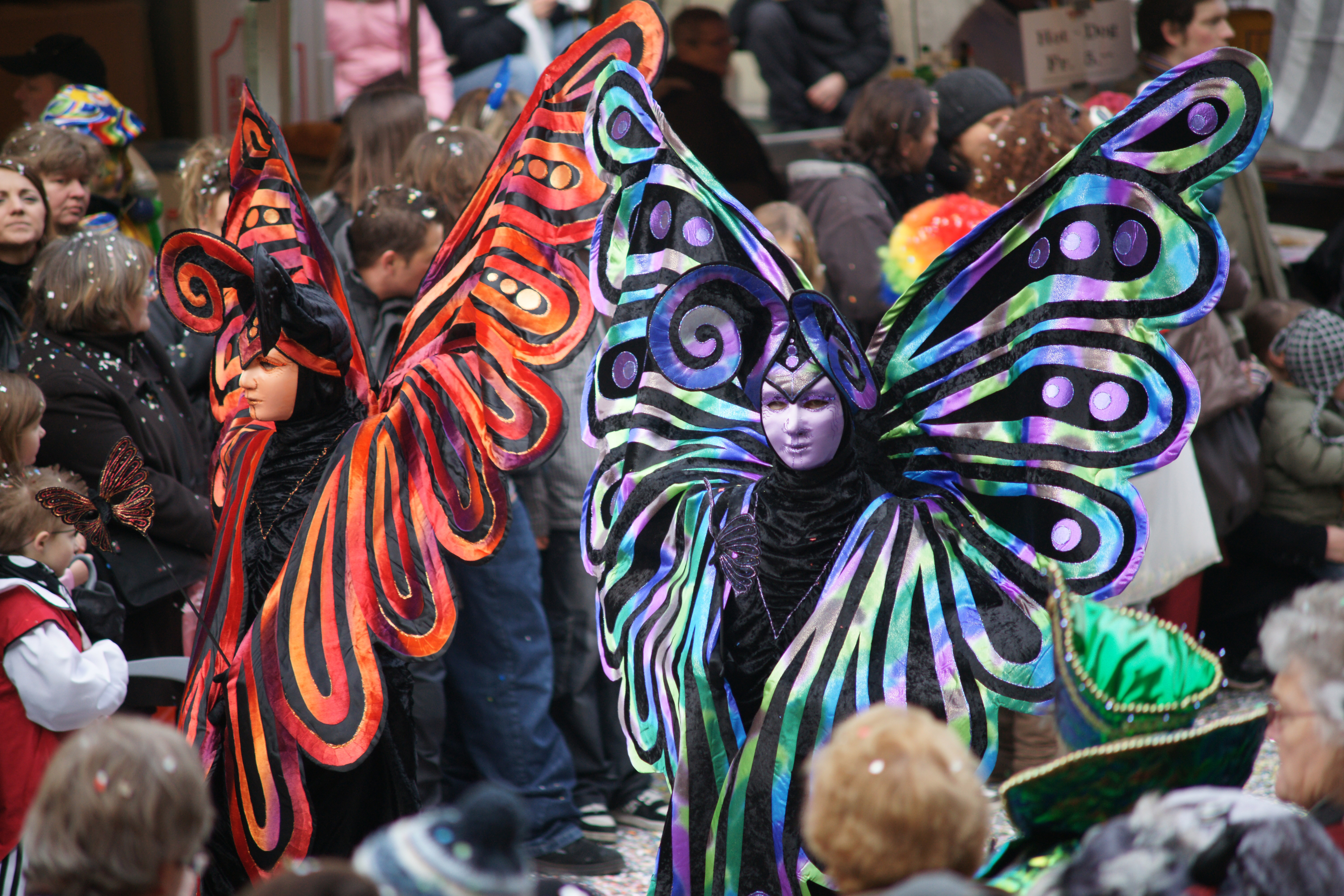
Participants in the Bernese Carnival 2010

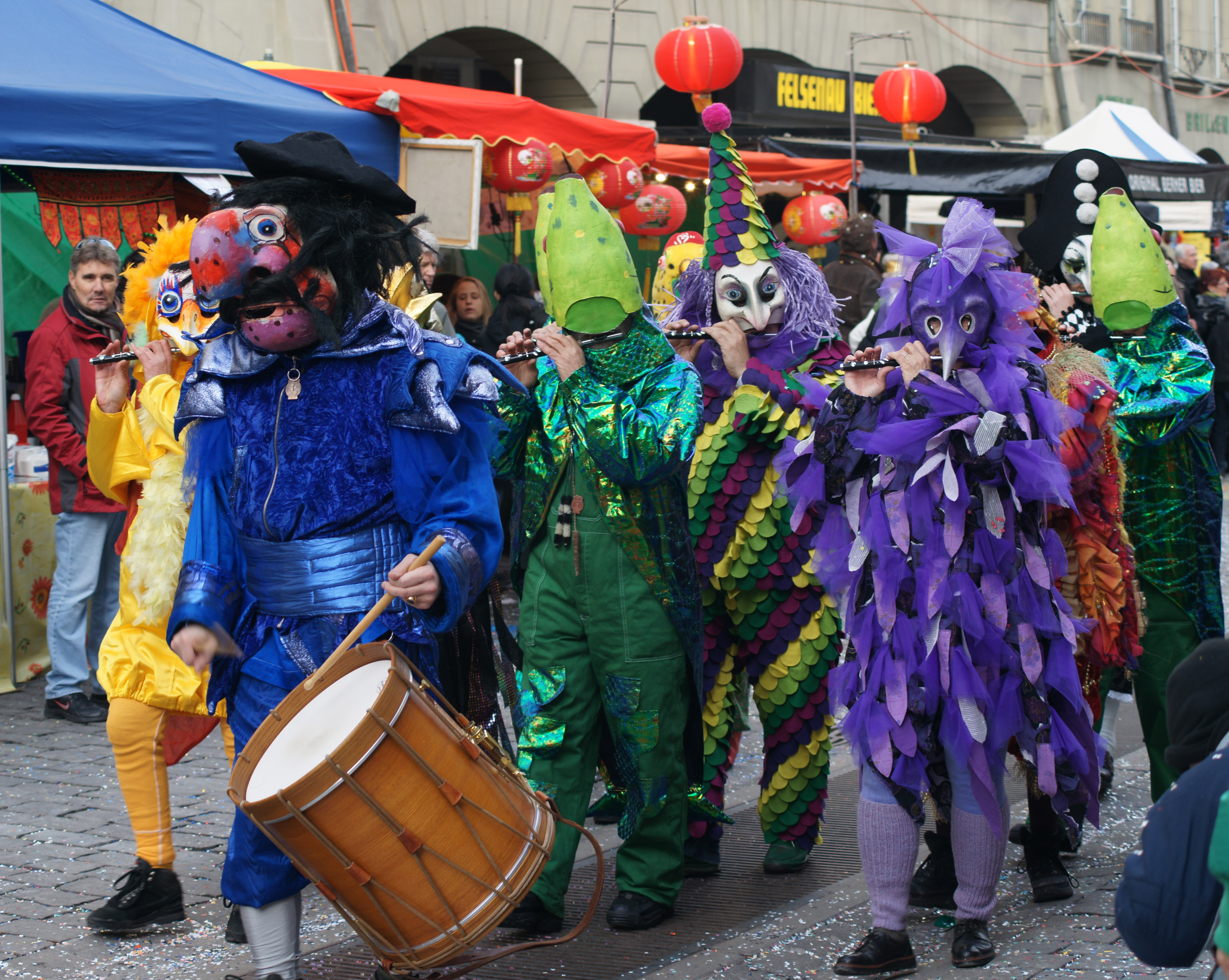
Participants in the Bernese Carnival 2010

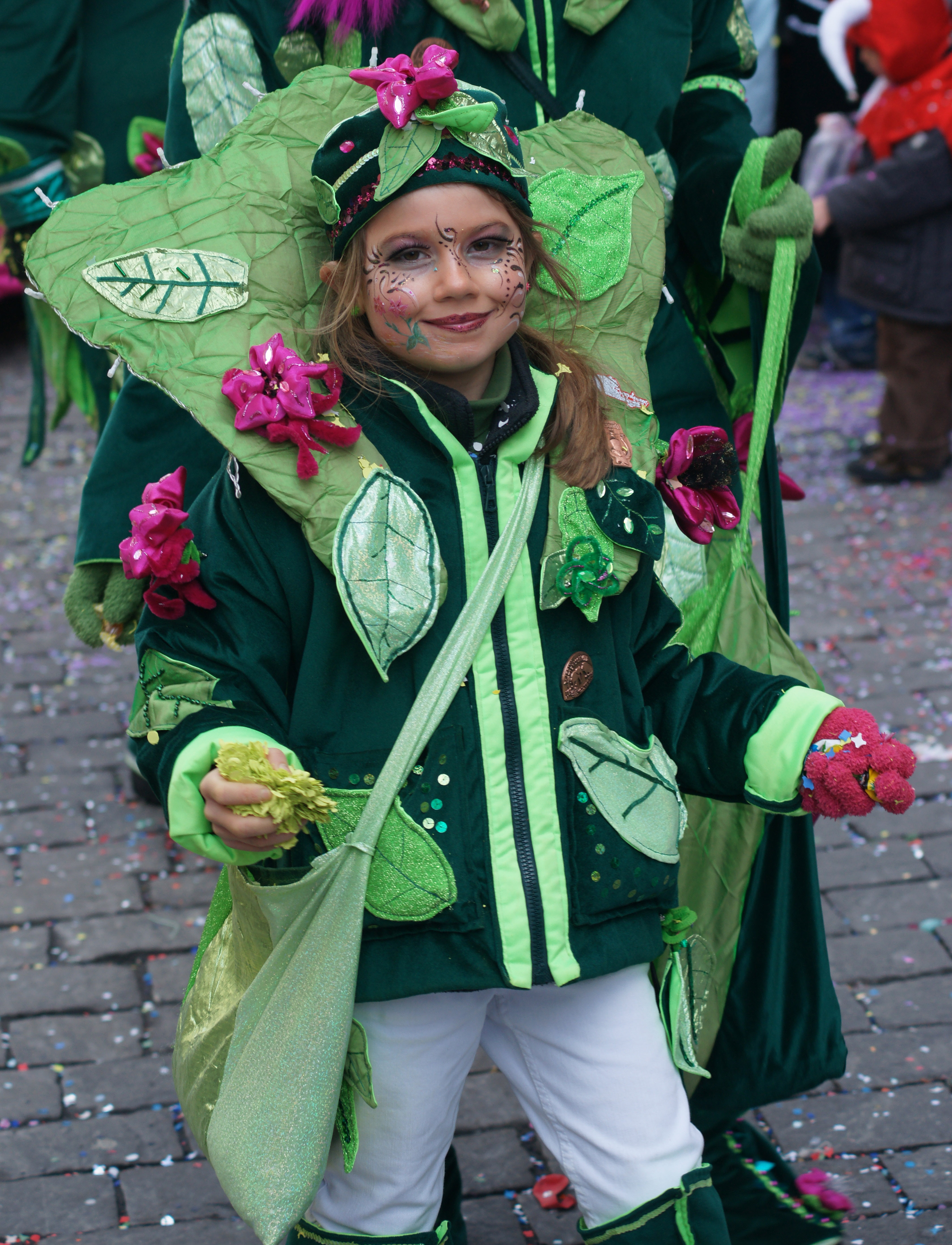
Participant in the Bernese Carnival 2010

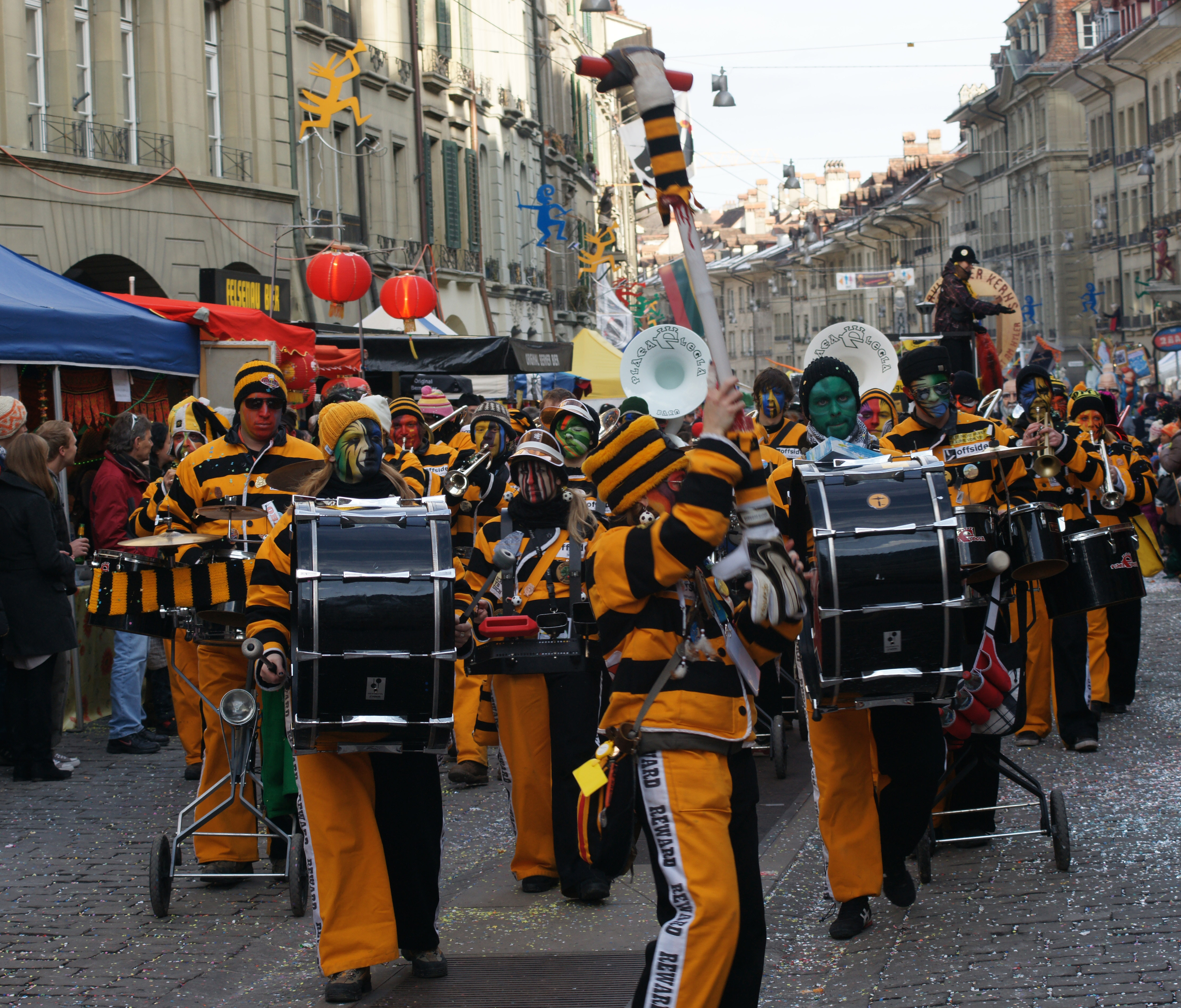
Participants in the Bernese Carnival 2010

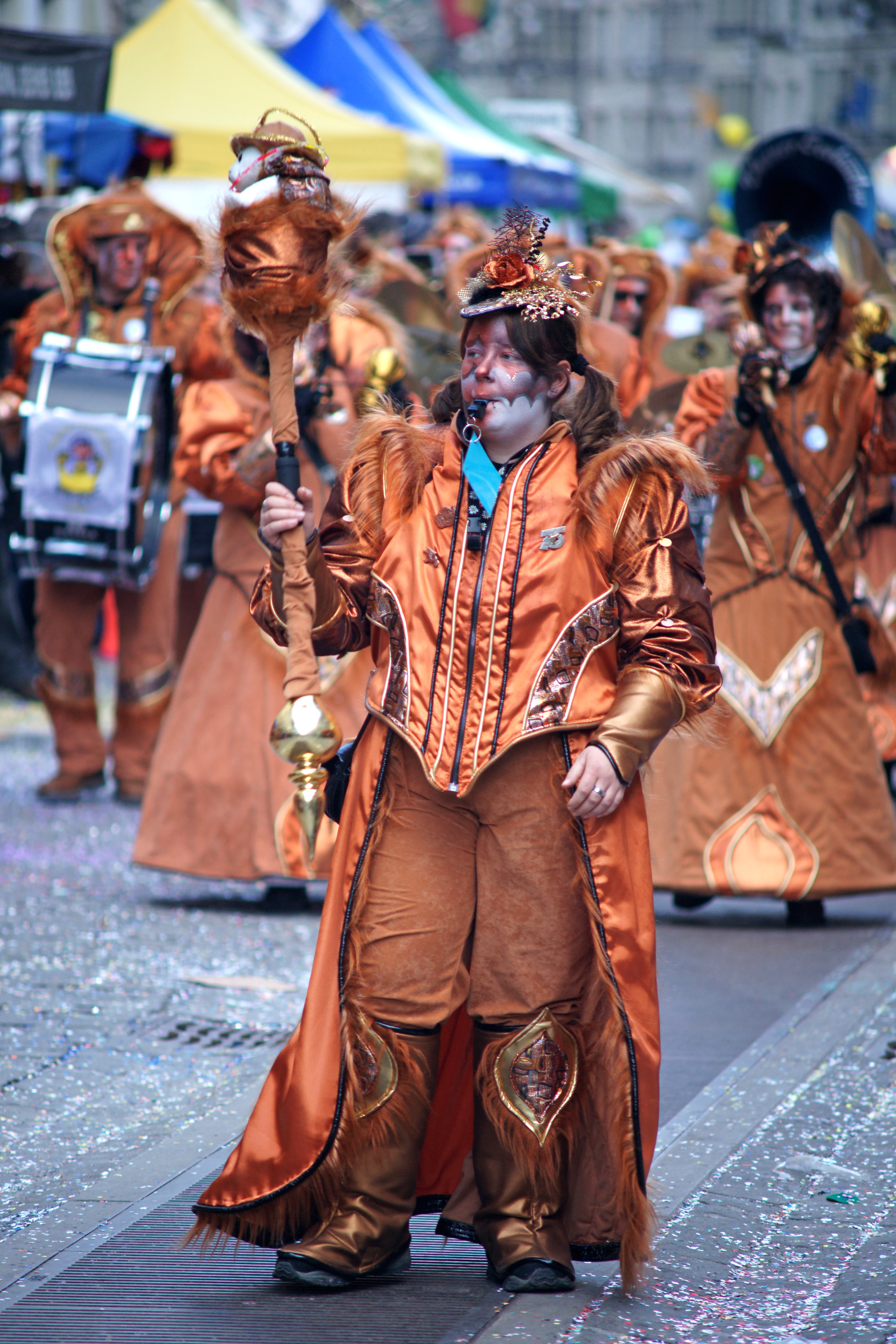
Participants in the Bernese Carnival 2010

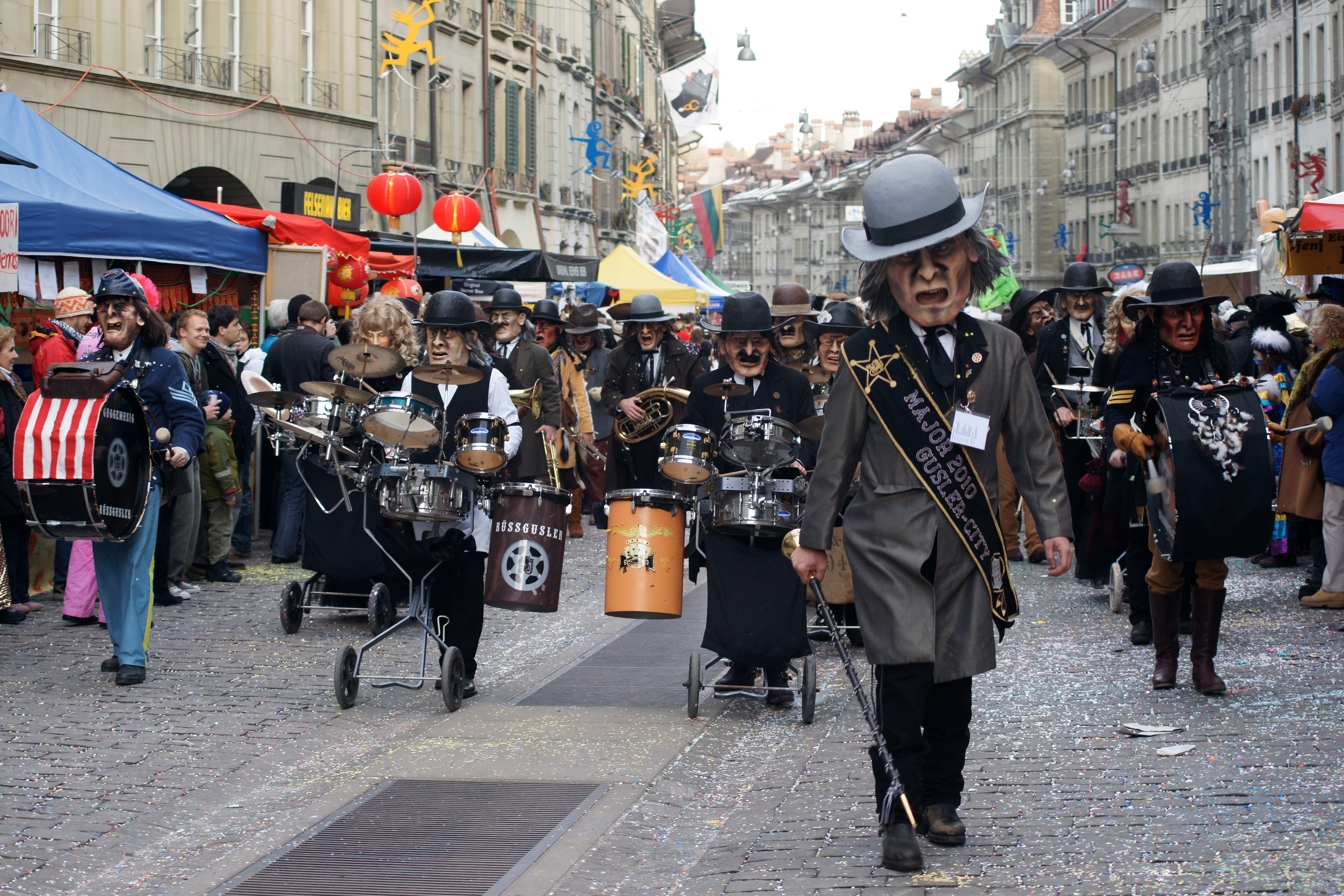
Participants in the Bernese Carnival 2010

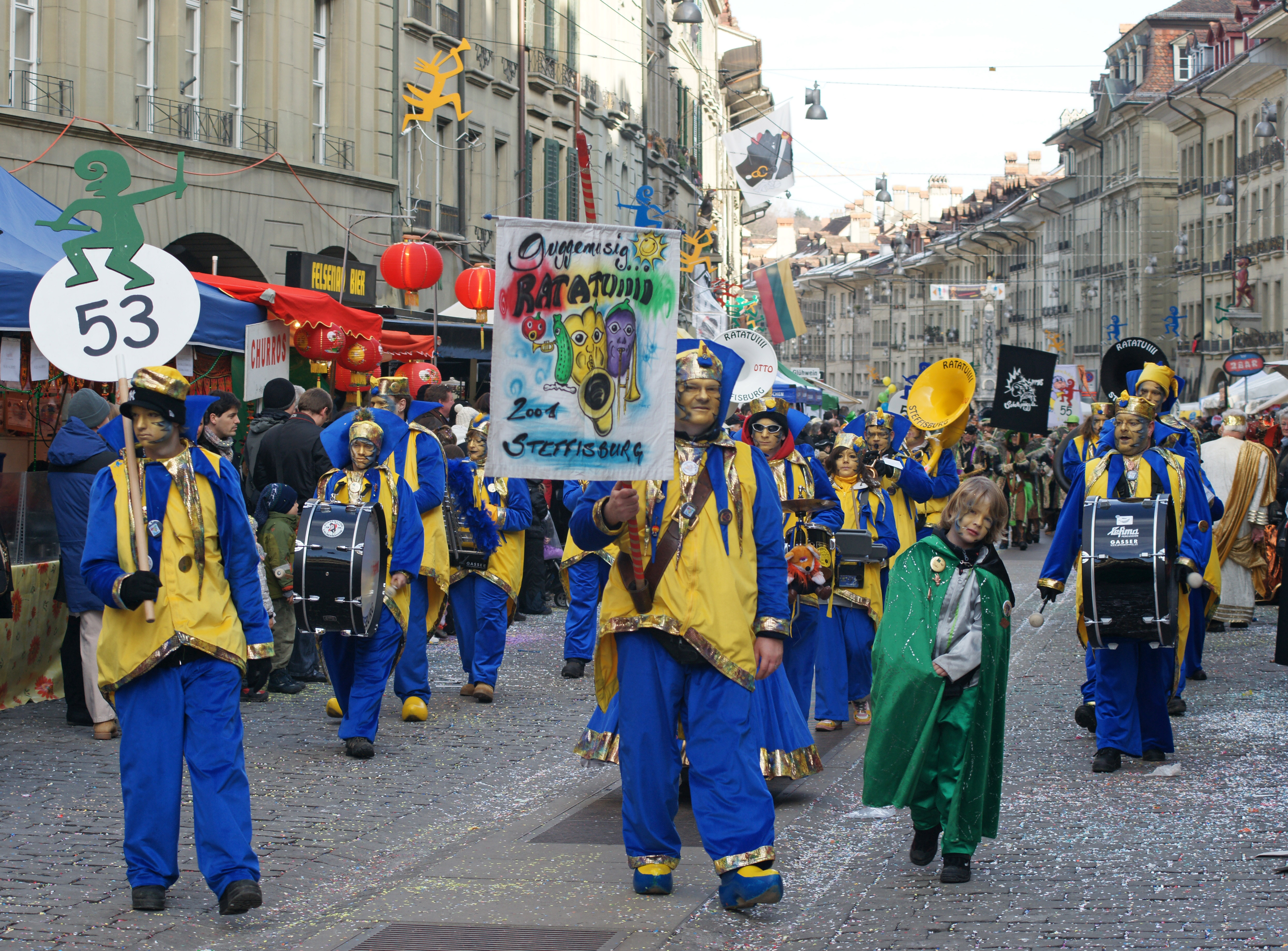
Participants in the Bernese Carnival 2010

== See also ==
- Carnival of Basel

== Bibliography ==
- Glenn Ehrstine (2002). Theater, culture, and community in Reformation Bern. BRILL. ISBN 978-90-04-12353-3.
