= Holländerturm =

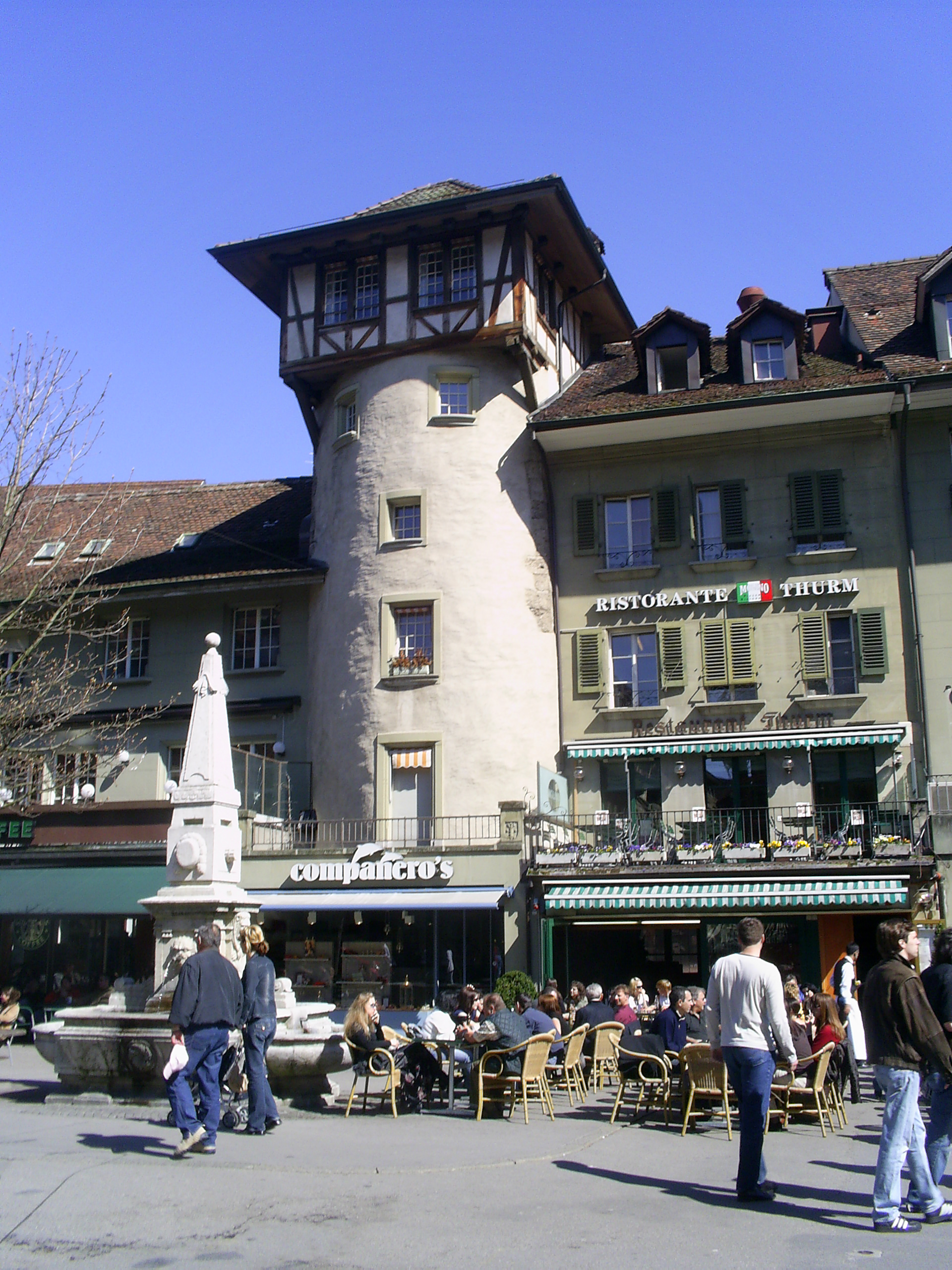
- Holländer tower at Waisenhausplatz 15

- Location within Switzerland
- 46°56′55.19″N 7°26′38.32″E
- Location: Old City of Bern

Site notes
- Governing body: Privately Owned

UNESCO World Heritage Site
- Part of: Old City of Bern world heritage site

The Holländerturm (Dutch tower) is a former defensive tower in the old city of Bern in Switzerland. It is part of the UNESCO Cultural World Heritage Site of the Old City of Bern. The tower was originally part of the city wall of Bern but was absorbed by the house at Waisenhausplatz 15.

== History ==
The age of the tower is unclear. Near the top of the tower an inscription reads 1230–1885. Based on this inscription and other evidence, since the 19th century it has been considered by many writers to be the one clear remnant of the Savoy city walls which were built between 1255 and 1260. However, Hofer states that the tower does not match either the inner or outer wall construction or position and is first shown in a drawing of the city from 1623. The late gothic windows are typical of the 16th and early 17th centuries.

The distinctive upper story was added in the 17th century by a Bernese officer who had served as a mercenary in Holland. It was at this point that the tower acquired the name Holländerturm. The tower was renovated in 1885.
