= Marktgasse =

Street in Bern, Switzerland

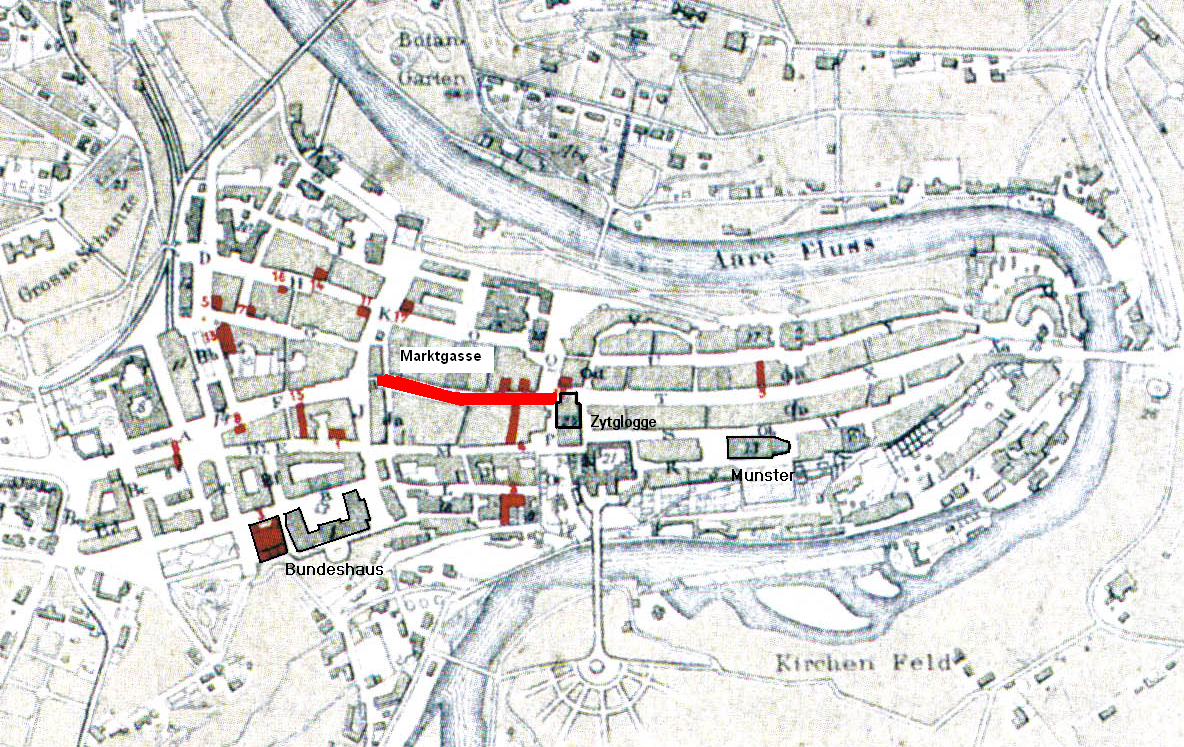
- Old City of Bern with Marktgasse highlighted
- Length: 300 m (980 ft)
- Location: Old City of Bern, Bern, Switzerland
- Postal code: 3011
- Coordinates: 46°56′52.61″N 7°26′50.14″E

The Marktgasse is one of the streets in the Old City of Bern, the medieval city center of Bern, Switzerland. It is part of the Innere Neustadt which was built during the 13th Century. It runs from the Käfigturm between Waisenhausplatz and Bärenplatz in the west to the Zytglogge between Kornhausplatz and Theaterplatz in the east. It is part of the UNESCO Cultural World Heritage Site that encompasses the Old City.

== History ==
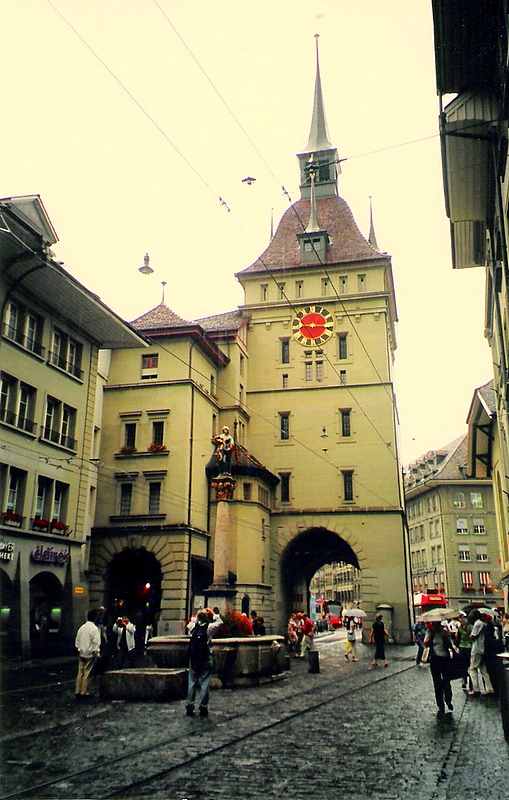
The western end of Marktgasse, the Käfigturm and Anna Seiler fountain

Marktgasse was first mentioned in 1286 as nova civitas bernensis. After the construction of the 3rd city wall the street was known as Innere Neuenstadt. This was shortened and until the early 19th century, the street was known unofficially as Neuenstadt. The name Wybermärit (märit is Swiss German for the German word markt which means market) is mentioned in the 18th century. Officially it was shortened into Marktgasse in 1798, but this only became common in the early 20th century.

== Video games ==
The street appears as a dynamic photo location for the player's cars in the racing game Gran Turismo 5 complete with trams and people.
