= Berenkuil (traffic) =

Dutch traffic circle with bicycle paths

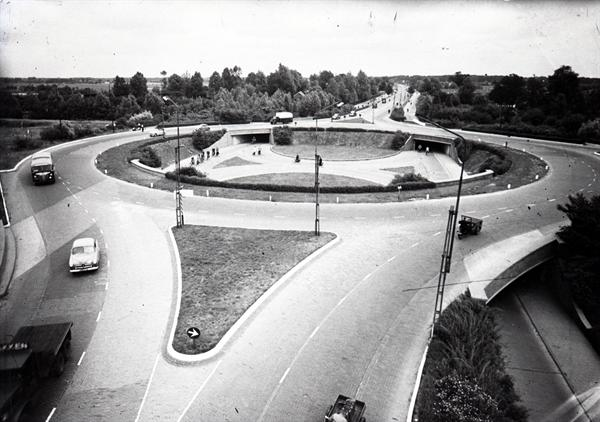
The Berenkuil in Utrecht

A berenkuil (from a Dutch word meaning a 'bear pit') is a type of traffic circle found in the Netherlands. In this construction, automotive traffic is directed around a raised outer circle. This leaves a sunken open space in the center of the circle which is used for bicycle paths.

Perhaps the first berenkuil, and the one that gives its name to this type of circle, is the one in Utrecht, built in 1944. There are several theories for the origin of its name, including the possibility that an actual bear pit was located there, or that it was named in honor of the British 49th (West Riding) Infantry Division, nicknamed the polar bears, who liberated Utrecht from the Nazis.

== Other examples ==
- In Eindhoven, the Berenkuil (a traffic circle of the same type on the city's ring road, officially known as Insulindeplein) has become an official free zone for graffiti and has been the site of graffiti festivals. In 2011, a new roundabout for cyclists shaped as a kind of "inverted berenkuil", named Hovenring, has been constructed between Eindhoven and Veldhoven in the Netherlands.

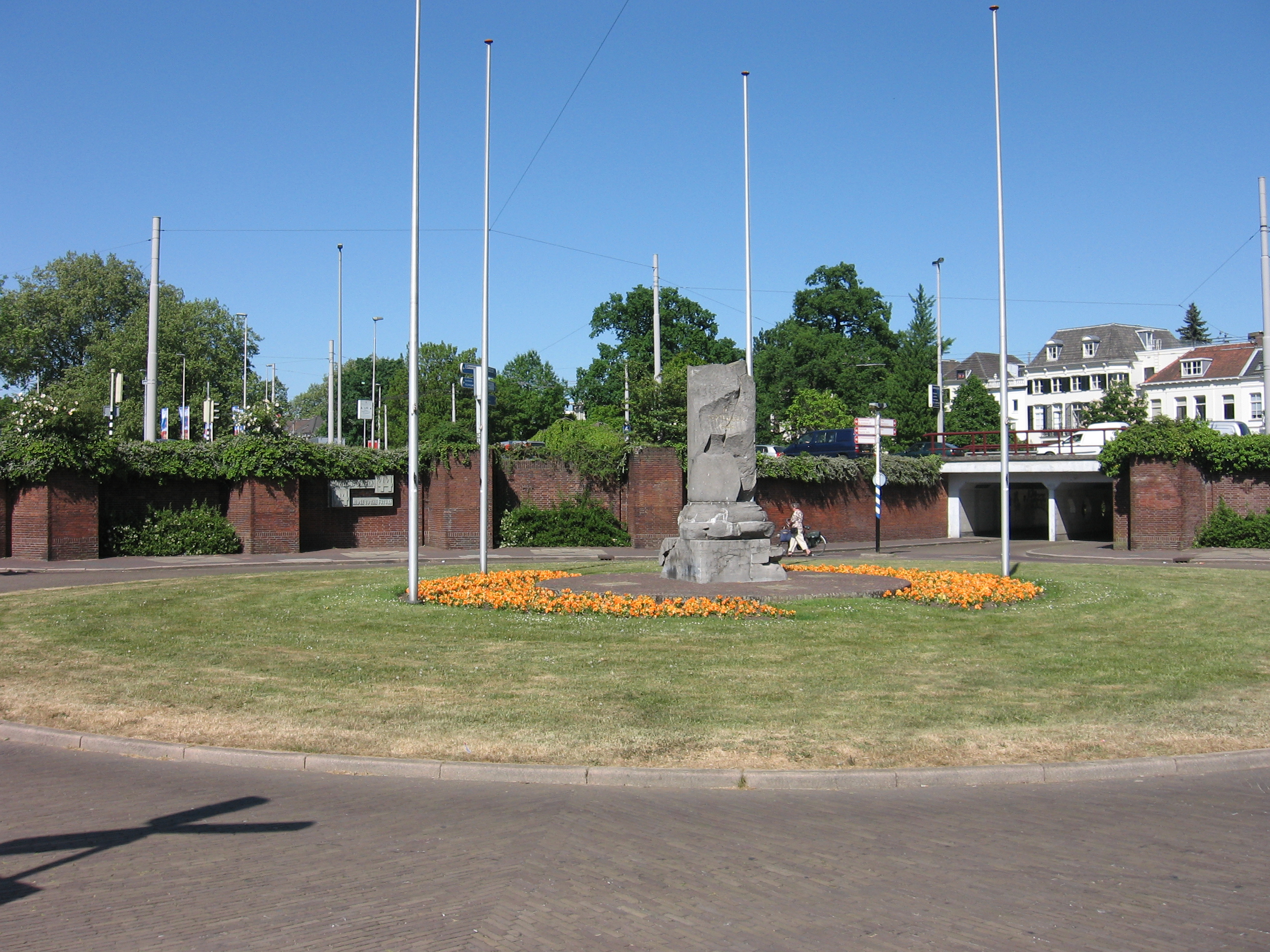
Airborneplein, berenkuil in Arnhem

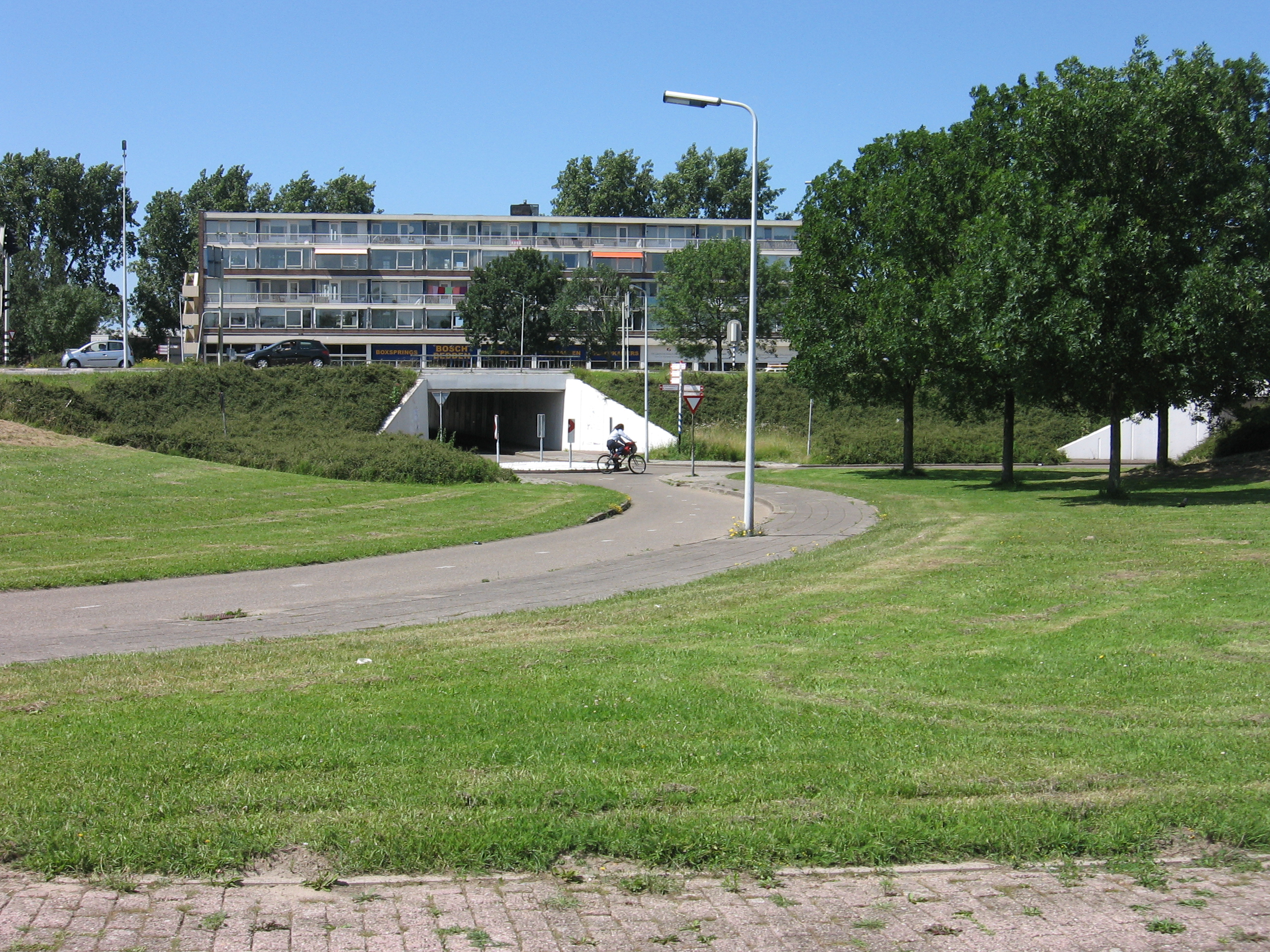
Lammenschansplein, a berenkuil in Leiden

- Other well-known berenkuil circles in the Netherlands include the Airborneplein in Arnhem, a traffic circle in the access road to the Passewaaij neighborhood in Tiel, a traffic circle in the center of Rijssen on the crossing of the N347 and the N350, and the Lammenschansplein, a traffic circle in Leiden.
- In Brussels, the Verboekhovenplein is commonly called Berenkuil. However, although it has a lowered central area, it is used for a train line rather than for bicycle paths.
- A traffic circle of similar design also exists in southern Tallinn, Estonia, at the intersection of Tehnika and Veerenni.
