= Berenkuil, Eindhoven =

Coordinates: 51°26′49″N 5°30′1″E

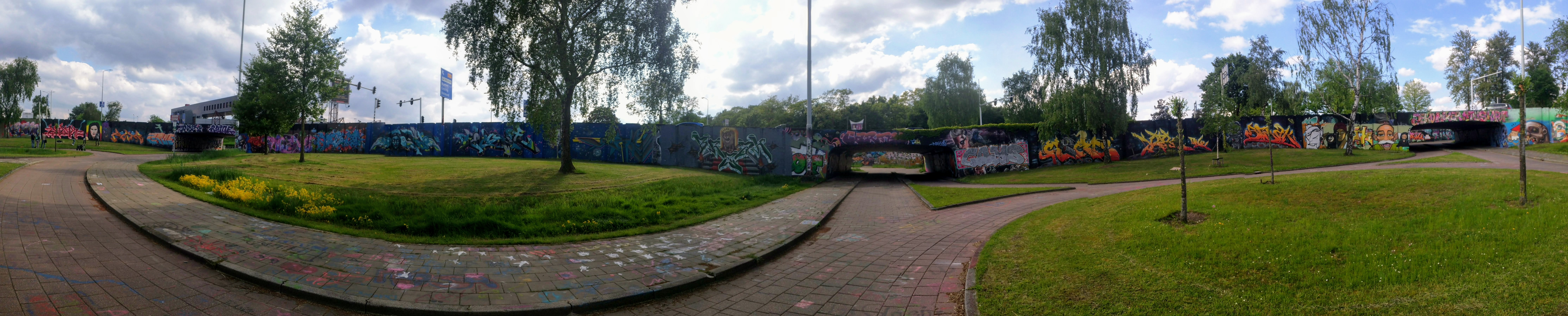
Panoramic view of Berenkuil

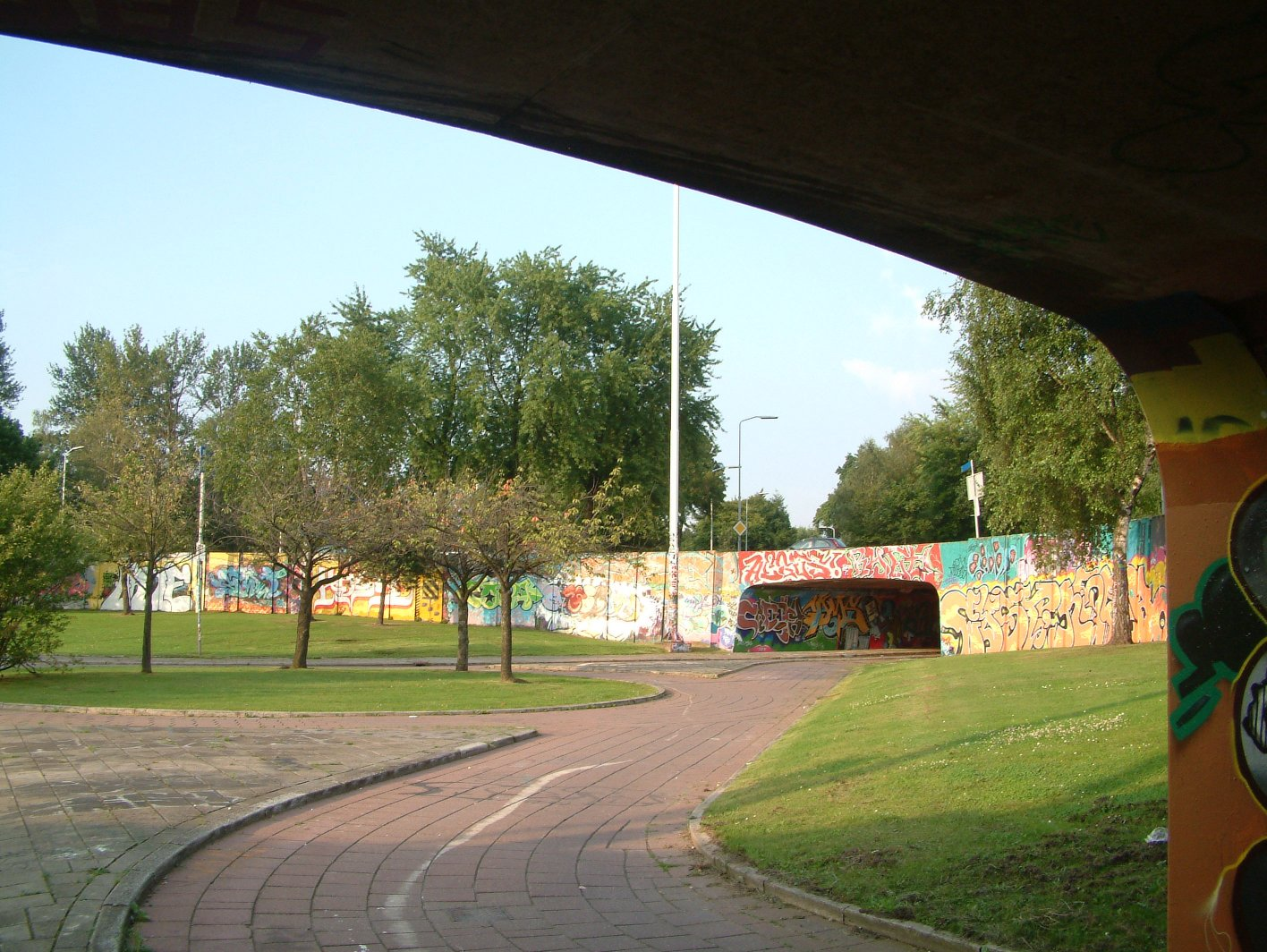
The lower circle of the Berenkuil

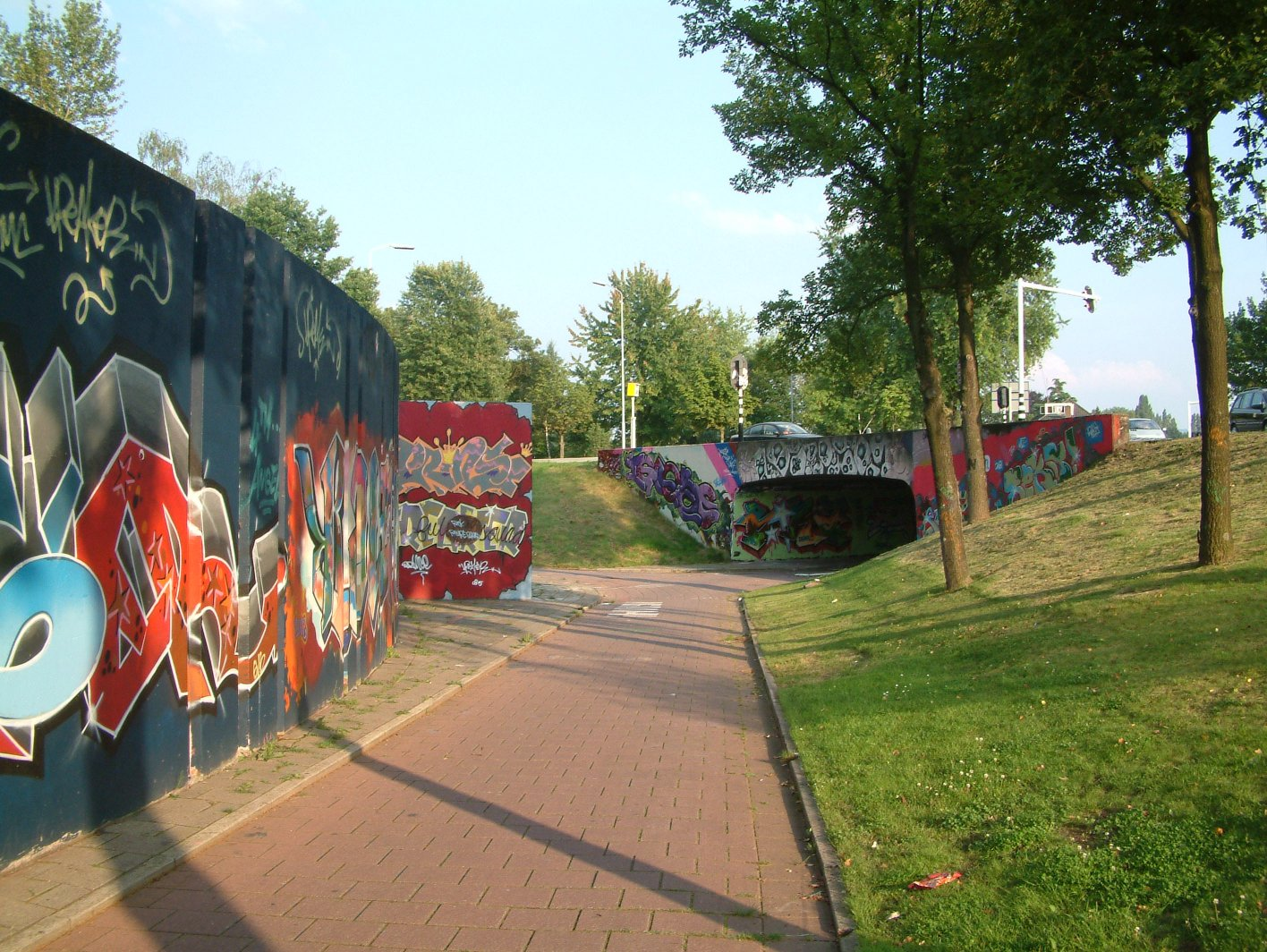
One of the access ramps leading into the Berenkuil

The Berenkuil (known officially as Insulindeplein) is a traffic circle in the Dutch city of Eindhoven, near the campus of the Eindhoven University of Technology. An outer circle for automotive traffic surrounds a second sunken circle for bicycles and motorscooters; ramps from the bicycle lanes along the nearby streets lead into the lower circle via four underpasses. This design for a traffic circle is one that is called a berenkuil (meaning bear pit) in the Netherlands.

Insulindeplein is part of the Eindhoven ring road and connects the center of Eindhoven to the highway to Helmond. It's also the access road in northern and southern directions, and forms the crossroads of many bicycle paths, bicycle crossings and pedestrian tunnels.

The Berenkuil is also well known in Eindhoven for another reason: it has been designated a freezone for graffiti artists, where they can paint graffiti without interference from the police. As a result, artists have created several large and impressive works on the walls and the area has become an unofficial open-air museum. On 11 and 12 September 2010, the Berenkuil was the stage for the international graffiti festival "Step In The Arena", which was held again on 9 and 10 July 2011.

== Graffiti ==
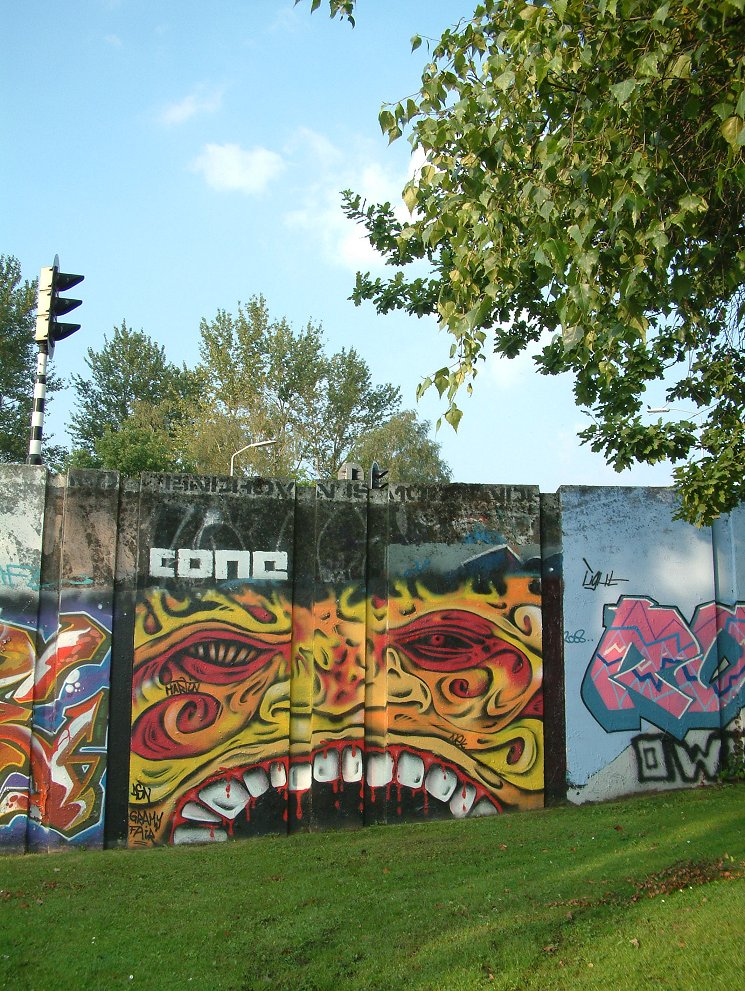

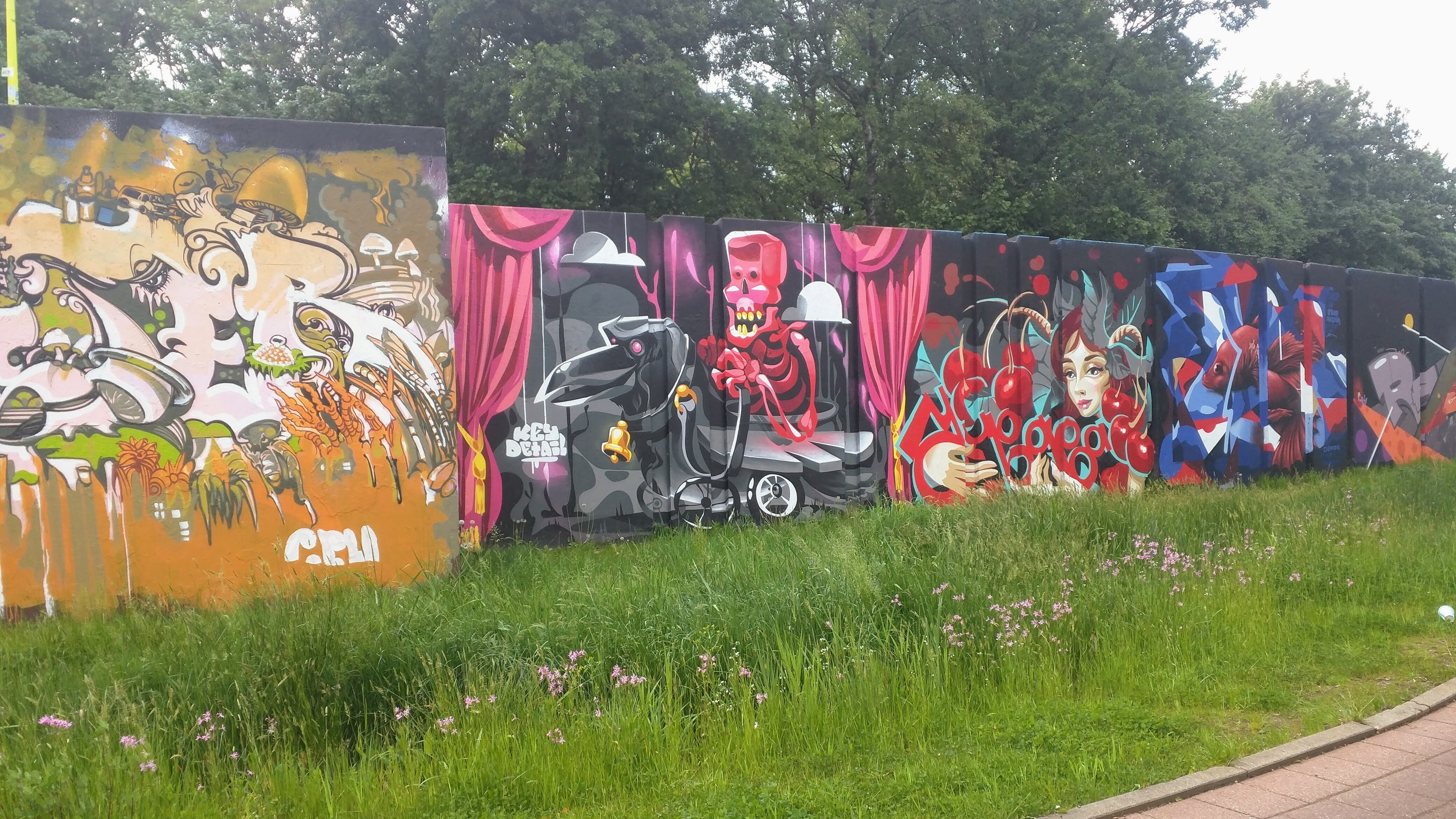
