= Bärenplatz =

Square in Bern, Switzerland

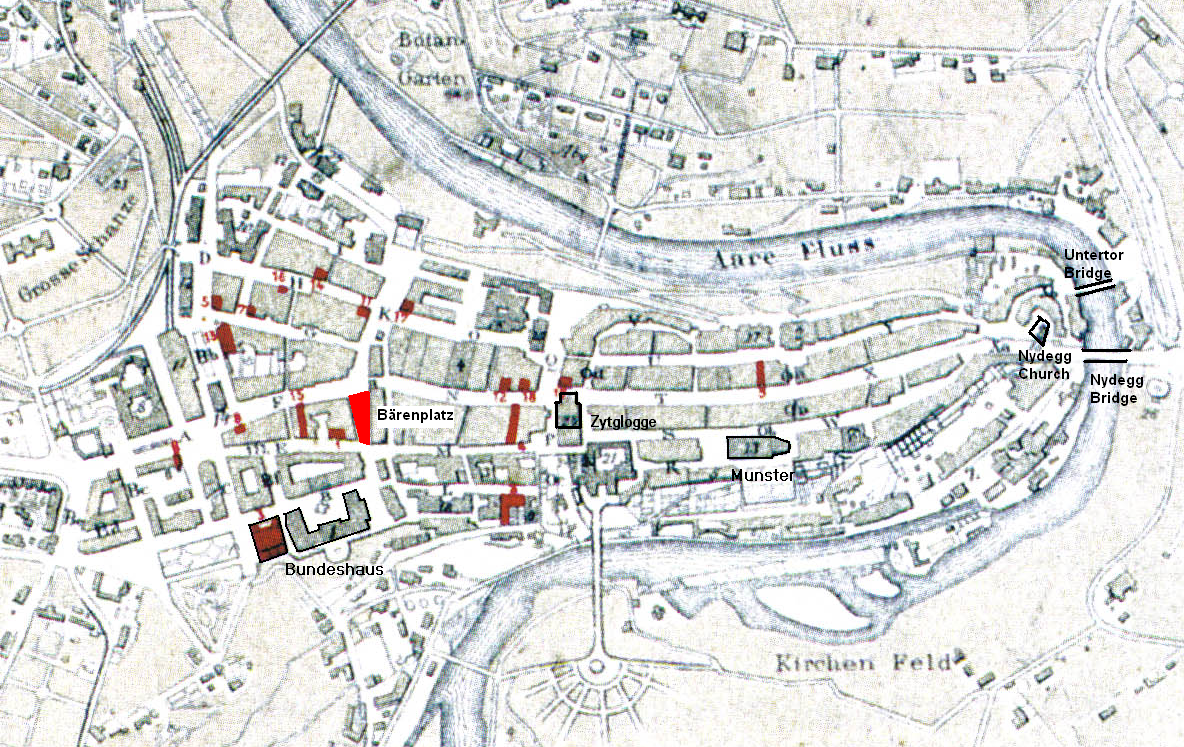
- Old City of Bern with Bärenplatz highlighted

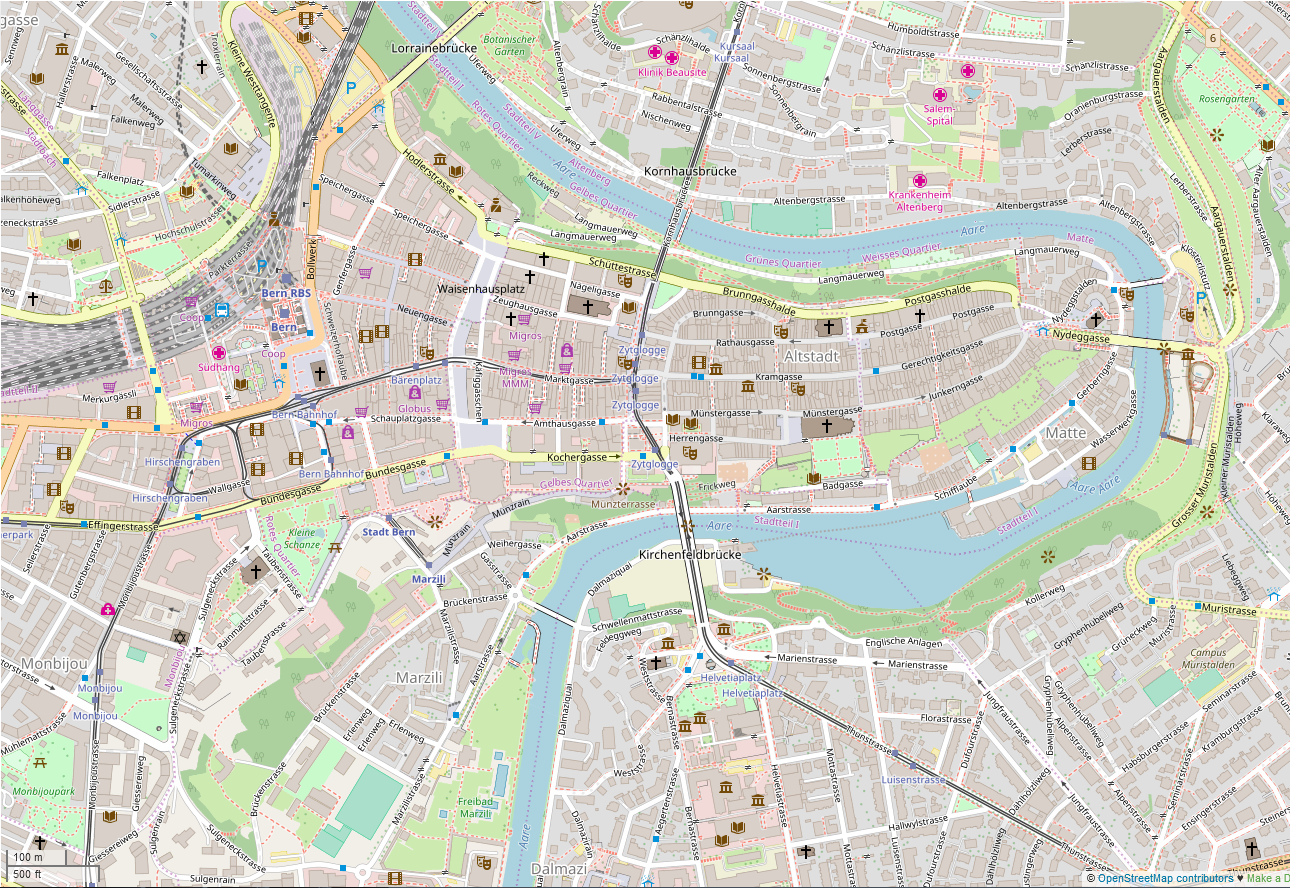
- Location within Bern Location within Canton of Bern Location within Switzerland
- Location: Old City of Bern, Bern, Switzerland
- Postal code: 3011
- Coordinates: 46°56′51.85″N 7°26′37.08″E

Construction
- Construction start: 1579

The Bärenplatz (Swiss Standard German pronunciation: [ˈbɛːrənˌplats], "Bear Plaza") is a plaza in the Old City of Bern, the medieval city center of Bern, Switzerland. It is part of the Innere Neustadt which was built during the second expansion from 1255 to 1260. It is located north of Bundesplatz, west of Käfigturm and south of Waisenhausplatz. It is part of the UNESCO Cultural World Heritage Site that encompasses the Old City.

== History ==
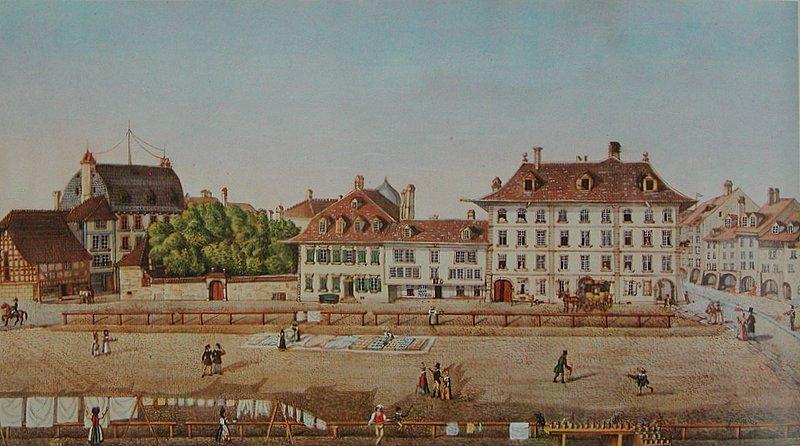
Bärenplatz in 1810

In 1256, the area that became Bärenplatz was a ditch that was part of the second city wall. In 1513 the northern section was walled off to become the Bärengraben (Bear Pits). In 1578 the bridge into the Käfigturm was demolished and in the next year, the southern section was filled in. The southern part of the plaza was used for the hay and wood market, as well as for the Rossmarkt or horse market from 1668/69. When the Bärengraben were moved, the northern section was filled in and came to be known as Holzmarkt (Wood Market). The middle section was then known as Viehmarkt (Cattle Market). The plaza was first mentioned as Bärenplatz in the mid-19th century.
