= Bear pit =

Animal enclosure

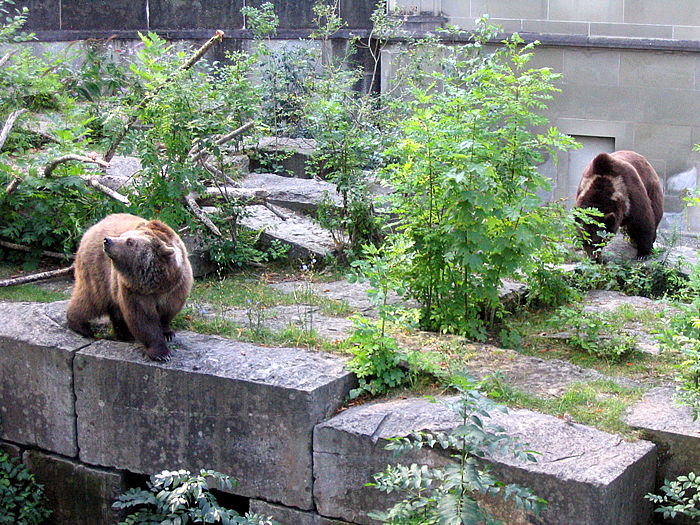
Bears in the Bärengraben in Bern (Switzerland)

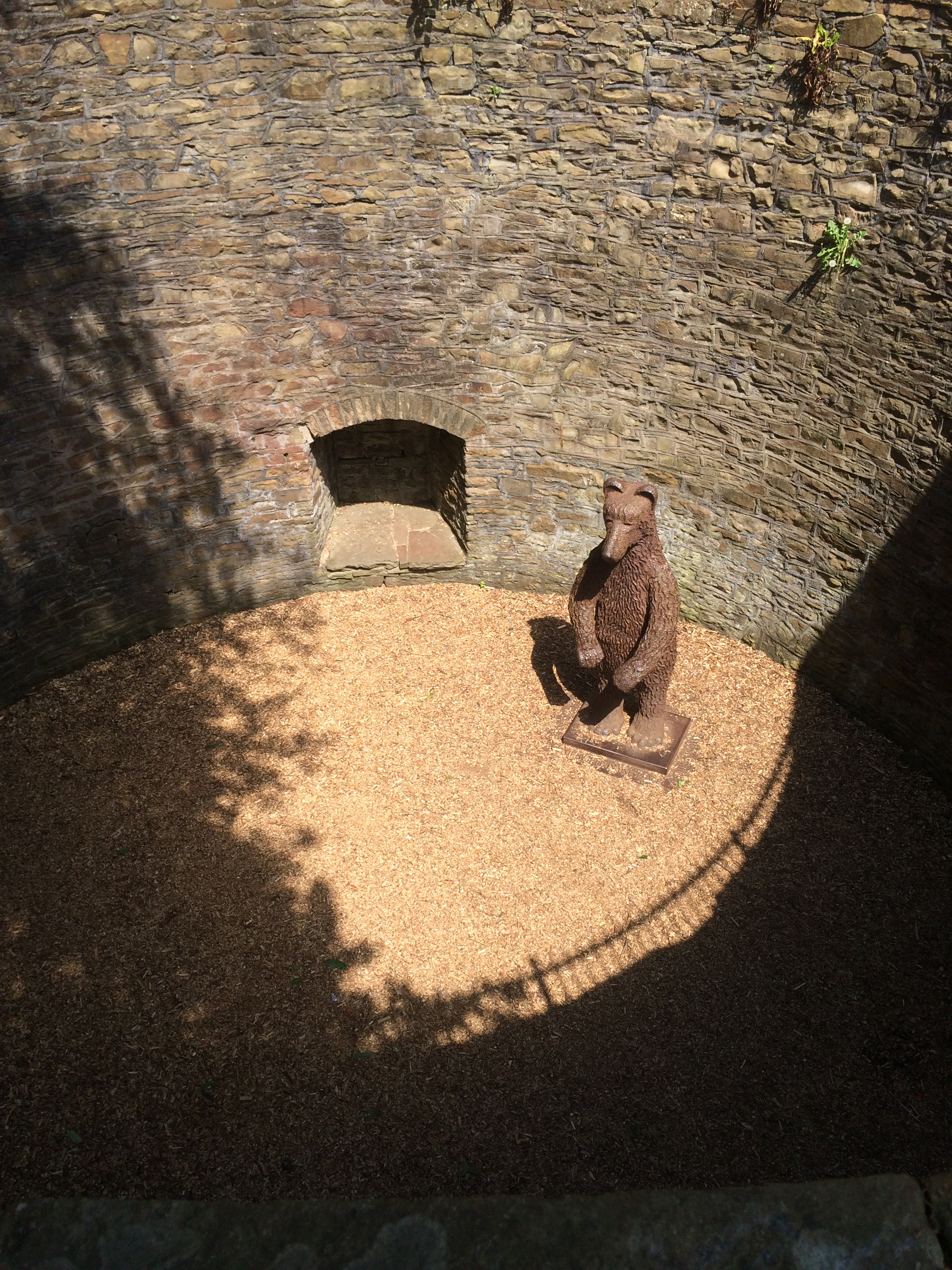
Historical bear pit at Sheffield Botanical Gardens in England, now containing a statue

A bear pit is an enclosure historically used to display bears, typically for entertainment and especially bear-baiting. The pit area was normally surrounded by a high fence, above which the spectators would look down on the bears.

The most traditional form of maintaining bears in captivity is keeping them in pits, although many zoos have replaced these by more elaborate and spacious enclosures that attempt to replicate their natural habitats, for the benefit of the animals and the visitors.

== History ==
Bear pits originated as a place to keep bears used in bear-baiting. These pits were temporary structures, typically used just once. After the sport's popularity waned, bear pits continued to exist as a way to display bears for the public to see, and often, feed. In contrast to the ones used in baiting, these pits were permanent structures built with sturdy materials; the pit in Rosherville Gardens, for example, was made of brick. Bear pits peaked in popularity during the Victorian era, when the public developed a general fascination with exotic animals.

Several violent incidents were known to occur in British bear pits. The public generally saw captive bears as "clownish" and thus feared them little. A bear escaped a pit in the Orangery at Wakefield in 1844, killing a woman and badly mauling another before it was shot dead. At the London Zoo in 1867, a man climbed into a bear pit to retrieve his hat, and was attacked by a bear, but was rescued by a zookeeper. There are rumors of captive bears eating children during this time period, but they have never been confirmed.

== Modern day ==
Bear pits have largely fallen out of favor, as many zoos now try to make their animals' accommodations more natural. Zoo visitors tend to view animals in natural settings as "active", and those in more artificial settings as "passive". Animal rights groups, such as People for the Ethical Treatment of Animals, oppose the existence of bear pits as cruel, claiming that bears cannot get enrichment from such constructions, and seek to close the few that remain.

A short-lived American alternative to bear pits was Edmund Heller's bear exhibit at the Washington Park Zoo. Heller attempted to simulate nature by mixing different species (namely polar, black and grizzly bears, as well as wolves) in the same enclosure. This proved disastrous, as polar bears would drag black bears into the water, drown them, and then eat them. Mixing different species is generally not practiced today.

The Bärengraben of Bern, Switzerland was built in 1857. It allowed visitors to feed the bears, which resided in a concrete pit. In the early 1990s, a swimming pool and softer gravel ground were added to it, but complaints were still made. Eventually, in 2002, a contest was held to design a new bear facility. In 2009, a much larger enclosure called the Bären Park (Bear Park) was opened next to the old bear pit. The old pit still stands, but no longer contains any animals.

Another modern bear pit is the Three Bears General Store in Pigeon Forge, Tennessee. Attached to a shop, the pit features live bears in a concrete pit that visitors can feed. The exhibit has been criticized as cruel by animal rights activists.

== In culture ==
As part of a project commissioned by the Orangery, site of the fatal 1844 mauling, artist Rebecca Chesney created a series of portraits of those involved in the attack.

In the young adult novel series Seekers, about anthropomorphic bears, Lusa, one of the protagonists, grew up in what she calls the "bear bowl" in the Greater Vancouver Zoo. The book depicts the zoo as a safe place in comparison to the wild, where Lusa eventually escapes to, yet also portrays it as restraining and a poor fit for Lusa's adventurous spirit.

The phrase "bear pit" has entered the common vernacular. In Scotland, the phrase bear pit is used to describe bars or public houses that are known to have a violent reputation. Another meaning of "bear pit" is for an unusually aggressive political arena, in which direct, heated attacks are common. The term bear pit is also used to describe a tournament or sparring format, sometimes also referred to as "king of the hill".

== See also ==
- Berenkuil (traffic)
- Menagerie
- Zoo
