= Waisenhausplatz =

Square in Bern, Switzerland

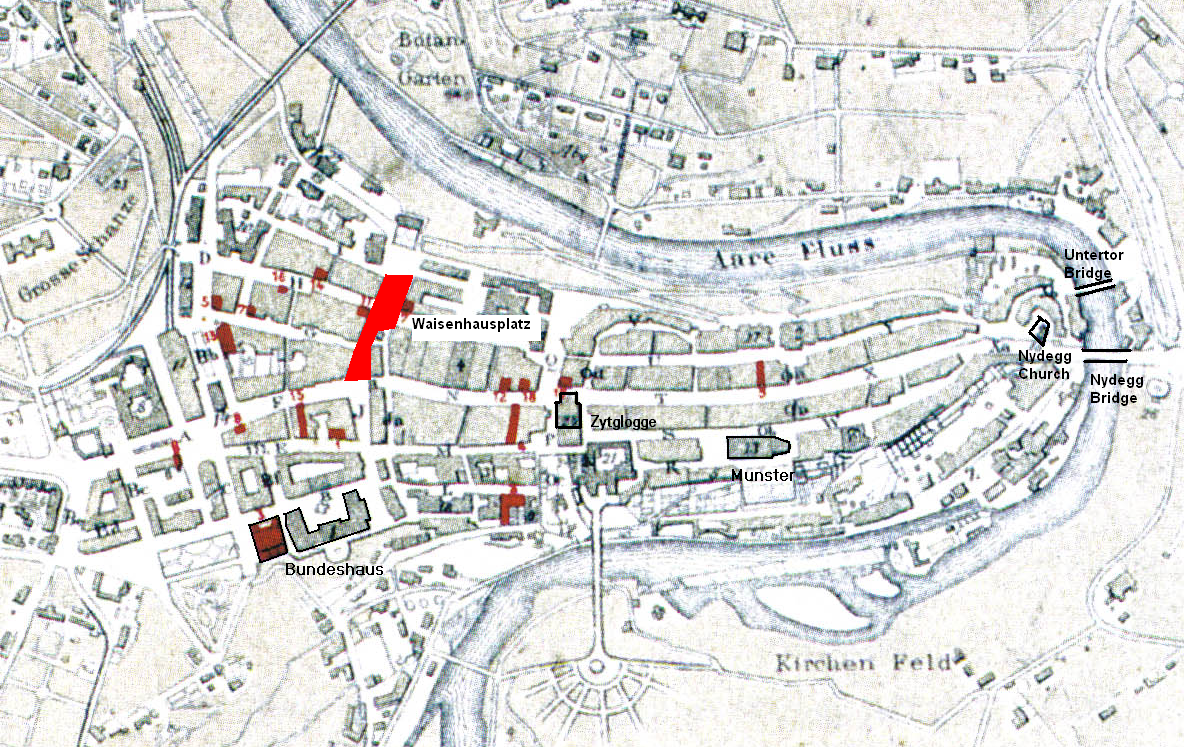
- Old City of Bern with Waisenhausplatz highlighted
- Location: Old City of Bern, Bern, Switzerland
- Postal code: 3011
- Coordinates: 46°56′57.04″N 7°26′38.78″E

The Waisenhausplatz (Orphanage Plaza) is a plaza in the Old City of Bern, the medieval city center of Bern, Switzerland. It is on the edge of the Innere Neustadt which was built during the second expansion from 1255 to 1260, though the plaza was not built until later. It is on the north of the peninsula, and divided from Bärenplatz by Marktgasse. It is part of the UNESCO Cultural World Heritage Site that encompasses the Old City.

== History ==
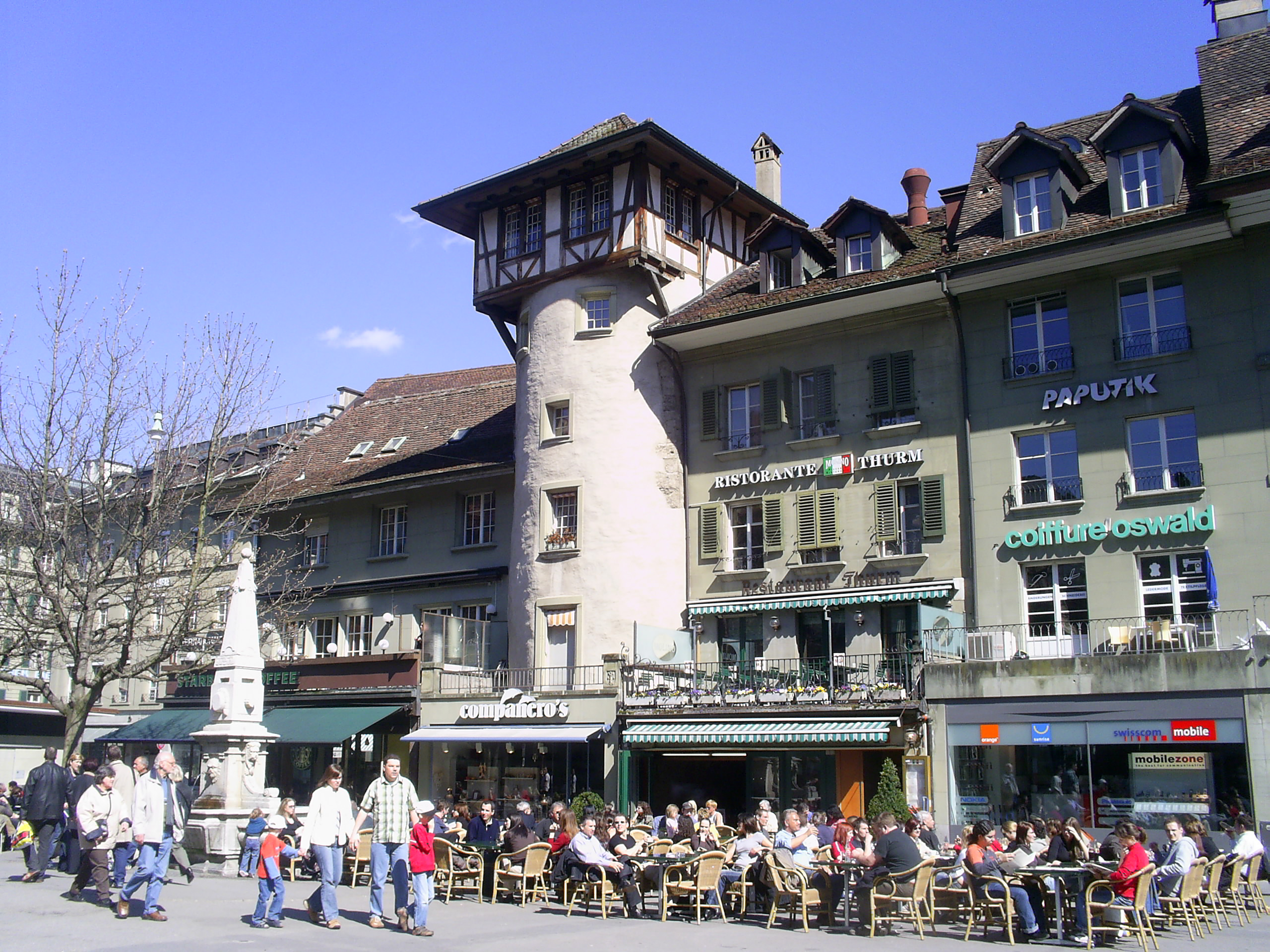
Waisenhausplatz and the Holländerturm (Holland tower)

Waisenhausplatz was first used to describe three formerly separate plazas in the 19th century. The southern portion (Nr. 2–14) was built over the ditch in front of the second city wall in the 16th century. Originally known as Viehmarkt (Cattle Market), then Holzmarkt (Wood Market), later as Weinplatz (Wine Plaza) and finally in the 18th and 19th centuries as Schweinemarkt (Pork Market). The middle section of Waisenhausplatz (Nr. 16–28) was also built over the protective ditch, the Tachnaglergraben, and was known as Zeughausplatz (Armory Plaza). The northern section (Nr. 29/30) was built in 1784 and was always known as Waisenhausplatz.
