= Bärengraben =

Tourist attraction in the Swiss capital city of Bern

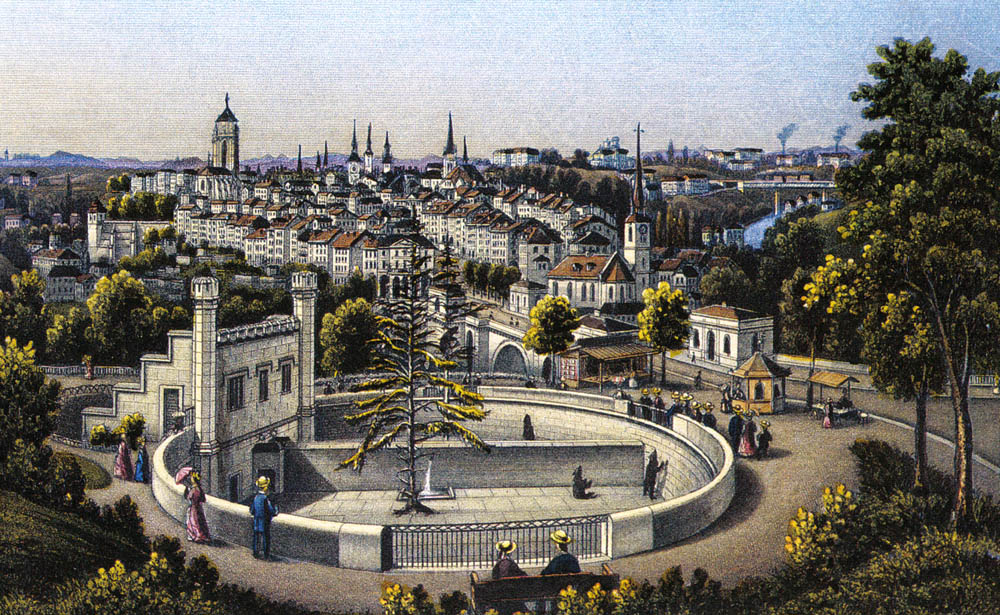
- The Bärengraben around 1880
- Interactive map of Bärengraben
- 46°56′52.87″N 7°27′34.66″E
- Date opened: 1857
- Location: Bern, Switzerland
- Website: www.baerenpark-bern.ch

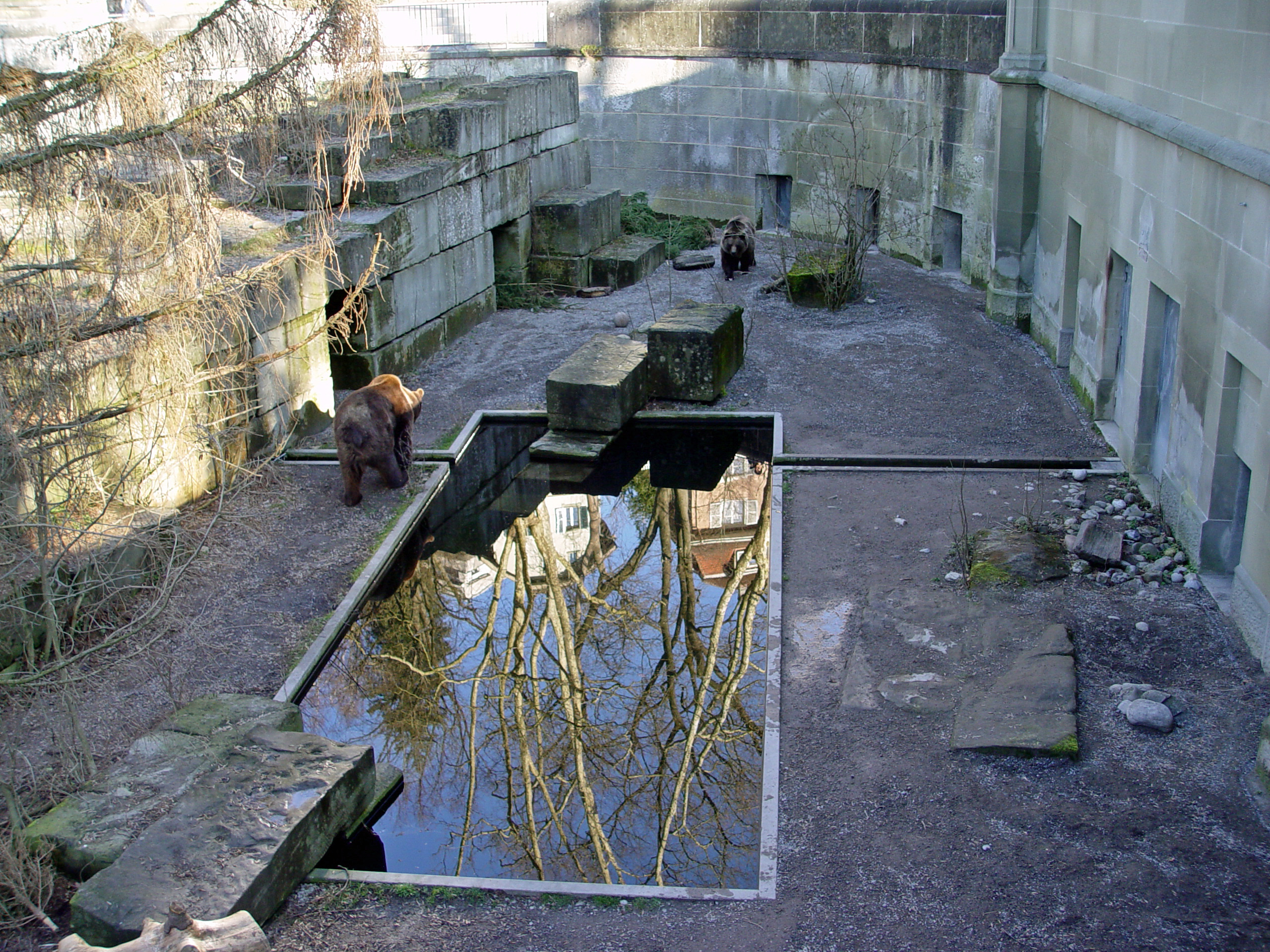
Partial view of Bärengraben in modern times

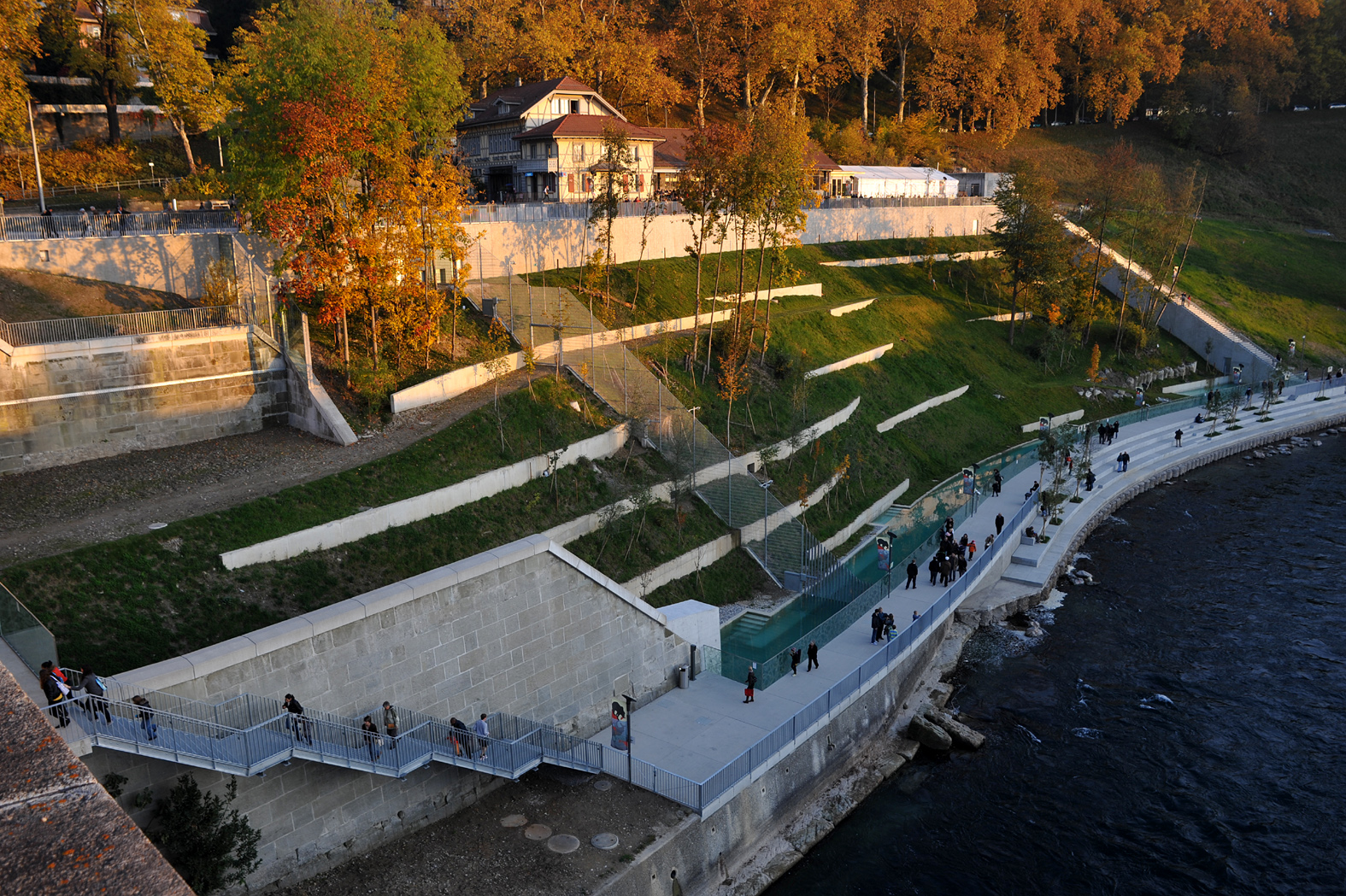
The BärenPark; the Bärengraben is at the upper level to the left of this image

The Bärengraben, or Bear Pit, is a tourist attraction in the Swiss capital city of Bern. It is a bear pit, or enclosure housing bears, situated at the eastern edge of the old city of Bern, next to the Nydeggbrücke and the River Aar. Although still in use, the Bärengraben has been supplemented since 2009 by the adjacent BärenPark, a larger and more natural enclosure alongside the River Aar.

The Bärengraben and BärenPark are administered as a geographically discrete part of the city's Dählhölzli Zoo. The Bärengraben is a Swiss heritage site of national significance, and is of particular significance in Bern because the bear is a symbol of both the city and surrounding canton, and is featured in their coat of arms.

== History ==
The bear has long served as symbol of Bern. Legend has it that, in 1191, Duke Berthold V of Zähringen vowed to choose as namesake the first animal his hunt met in the wood that was to be chopped down for his new city. As Konrad Justinger’s chronicle puts it:

Then they caught a bear first, which is why the city was called Bern; and so the citizens had their coat and shield, which was a black bear in a white shield, going upright.

The first records of bears being kept in the city come from 1513, when the chronicler Valerius Anshelm described how the Bernese returned home victorious from the Battle of Novara, carrying both the captured standards and a living bear as spoils of war.

The first bear pit was at what is still called the Bärenplatz (Bear Plaza). The current pit is the fourth such enclosure, following on from pits at various locations around the city, and was first opened in 1857. In 1925, a smaller adjacent pit was added to raise the young bear cubs.

Between 1994 and 1996, the Bärengraben was completely renovated to improve conditions for the bears. Despite this, the keeping of bears in what still remained a bear pit led to many complaints. This, as well as new legal requirements, prompted a rethink of how the bears should be kept.

As a result, the BärenPark was opened in 2009, on the steeply sloping land between the Bärengraben and the bank of the River Aar. The original bear pit and the BärenPark were linked by a tunnel, allowing the bears to make use of both spaces. The smaller pit was no longer used by the bears, but was used instead to give access to the Bärengraben's shop and to provide a performance space.

In 2015, Schräglift Bärenpark ("Bärenbähnli"), an inclined lift, was built to improve accessibility.

== In culture ==
The Mary Plain series of fourteen children's books are partly set at the Bärengraben, with the story's main character, Mary Plain (who is a young bear) and her family living in the pits.

The Bärengraben can be briefly seen in the James Bond film On Her Majesty's Secret Service, as Bond, Tracy Bond and Marc-Ange Draco drive through Bern.

Confederate prison commander Henry Wirz remembers a childhood visit to "that ancient pit in Switzerland" in Chapter XX of MacKinlay Kantor's Pulitzer Prize-winning novel "Andersonville" (1955).

== Gallery ==
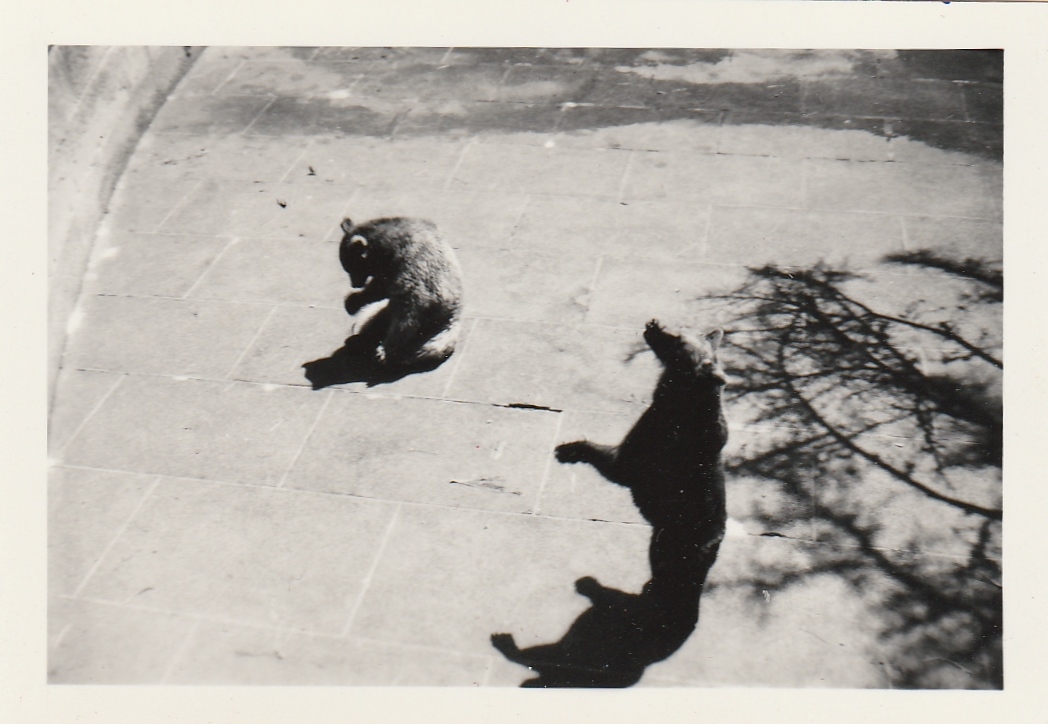
Bears in the pit in July 1961

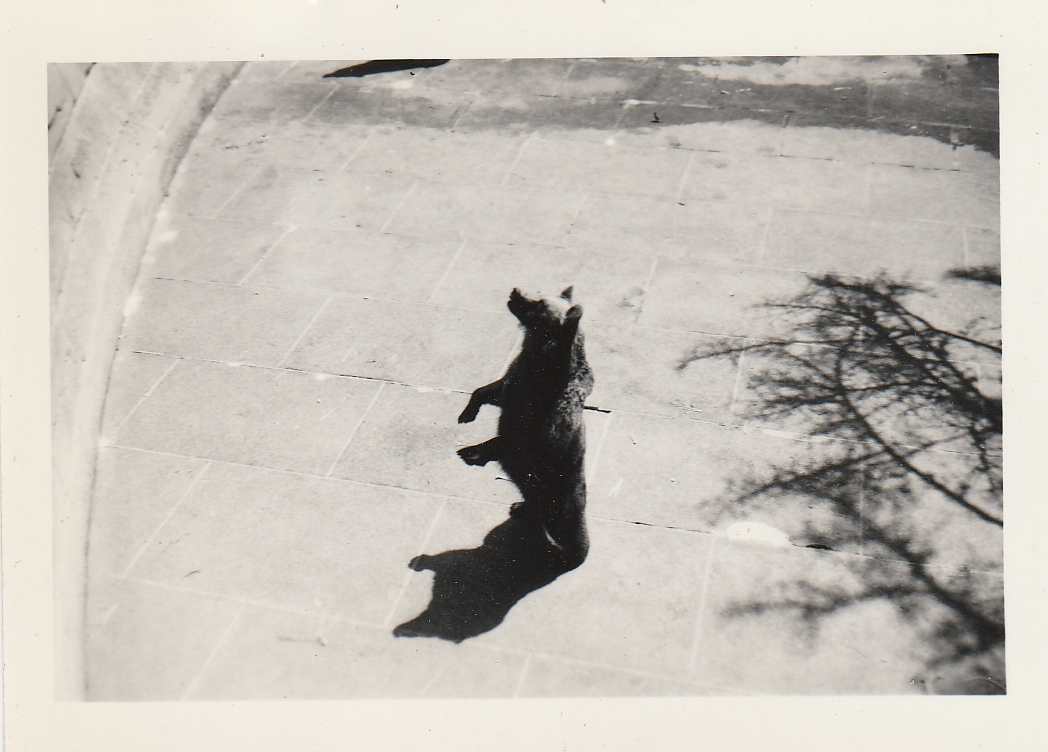
Single bear on hind legs
