= Igreja de Santa Clara =

Igreja de Santa Clara may refer to:

- Igreja de Santa Clara (Porto), a church in Portugal
- Igreja de Santa Clara (Santarém), a church in Portugal
