= List of Gothic architecture =

This is a list of buildings which are examples of Gothic architecture, either their totality or portions thereof; examples of Gothic Revival architecture have been excluded. This list is separated into regions relating to the borders and dominant powers during the period of when these buildings were constructed (as opposed to modern ones), however, these are subdivided into nations according to modern borders.

Note: Buildings in bold have either been designated as UNESCO World Heritage Sites or are part of one.

== British Isles ==
=== Republic of Ireland ===
All of the following existing Gothic buildings are either national monuments or national architectural heritage.

Image	Building	Place	Type	Date	Notes
	Adare Priory	Adare	Domestic Religious	c.1260–1633	Also known as Adare Friary, as Adare Augustinian Friary, and as Adare Augustinian Priory. Formerly known as the Black Abbey. The remaining buildings are known as St Nicholas' Church of Ireland Parish Church and St Nicholas' National School. The cloisters are in ruins.
	Ardfert Abbey	Ardfert	Domestic Religious	13th–16th centuries	Ruins.
	Ardfert Cathedral	Ardfert	Religious	12th–15th centuries	Also known as the Cathedral and Monastery of St Brendan. Ruins.
	Askeaton Abbey	Askeaton	Domestic Religious	14th–15th centuries	Also known as Askeaton Friary. Ruins.
	Athassel Priory	Golden	Domestic Religious	12th–16th centuries	Also known as the Priory of St Edmund, King and Martyr. Ruins.
	Athenry Abbey	Athenry	Domestic Religious	13th–15th centuries	Also known as the Priory Church of Saint Peter and Saint Paul, Athenry and as Athenry Priory. Ruins.
	Athenry Castle	Athenry	Domestic Military	c.1235–1250	
	Ballinskelligs Abbey	Ballinskelligs	Domestic Religious	15th century	Also known as St Michael's Priory and as Ballinskelligs Priory. Ruins.
	Ballybeg Priory	Buttevant	Domestic Religious	13th–16th centuries	Also known as St Thomas's Priory, as the Abbey of St Thomas, and as Ballybeg Abbey. Ruins.
	Baltinglass Abbey	Baltinglass	Domestic Religious	1148–14th century	Ruins.
	Bective Abbey	Bective	Domestic Religious	13th–16th centuries	Ruins.
	Black Abbey	Kilkenny	Domestic Religious	13th–14th centuries	Also known as the Church and Priory of the Most Blessed Trinity and as Holy Trinity Priory.
	Boyle Abbey	Boyle	Domestic Religious	12th–16th centuries	Ruins.
	Burriscarra Abbey	Carnacon	Domestic Religious	13th–15th centuries	Ruins.
	Burrishoole Friary	County Mayo	Domestic Religious	15th century	Also known as St Mary's Priory and as Burrishoole Priory. Ruins.
	Buttevant Franciscan Friary	Buttevant	Domestic Religious	13th century	Ruins.
	Cahir Abbey	Cahir	Domestic Religious	12th–16th centuries	Also known as the Priory of St Mary in Cahir. Ruins.
	Callan Augustinian Friary	Callan	Domestic Religious	15th century	Ruins.
	Carlingford Priory	Carlingford	Domestic Religious	14th century	Also known as the Dominican Priory of St Malachy, as Carlingford Abbey, and as Carlingford Friary. Ruins.
	Castledermot Abbey	Castledermot	Domestic Religious	13th–16th centuries	Also known as Castledermot Friary. Ruins.
	Castlelyons Friary	Castlelyons	Domestic Religious	14th century	Ruins.
	Christ Church Cathedral	Dublin	Religious	12th–19th centuries	Also known as the Cathedral Church of the Holy Trinity and as the Cathedral of the United Dioceses of Dublin and Glendalough and Metropolitan Cathedral of the United Provinces of Dublin and Cashel. Includes the surviving portions of St Michael's Church, most notably the tower.
	Clare Abbey	Clarecastle	Domestic Religious	12th century	Also known as the Abbey Church of Saint Peter and Saint Paul. Ruins.
	Clare Island Abbey	Clare Island	Domestic Religious	c.1460	Also known as Saint Brigid's Abbey. Partially in ruins.
	Claregalway Friary	Claregalway	Domestic Religious	13th century	Ruins.
	Clonfert Cathedral	Clonfert	Religious	12th century	Also known as the Cathedral Church of St Brendan.
	Clontuskert Abbey	Ballinasloe	Domestic Religious	1404–1471	Also known as the Priory of St Mary and as Clontuskert Priory. Ruins.
	Cloyne Cathedral	Cloyne	Religious	1250–c.1270	Also known as St Colman's Cathedral.
	Collegiate Church of St Peter and St Paul	Kilmallock	Religious	1241–1420	Also known as Kilmallock Collegiate Church. Ruin.
	Cong Abbey	Cong	Domestic Religious	13th century	Ruins.
	Corcomroe Abbey	Ballyvaughan	Domestic Religious	13th–16th centuries	Also known as the Abbey Church of Saint Mary of the Fertile Rock. Ruins.
	Creevelea Abbey	Dromahair	Domestic Religious	16th century	Also known as Dromahair Friary. Ruins.
	Derrynaflan Church	Littleton	Religious	11th–13th centuries	Ruins. Discovery site of the Derrynaflan Hoard.
	Donegal Friary	Donegal	Domestic Religious	15th century	Also known as Donegal Abbey. Ruins.
	Dromiskin Monastery	Dromiskin	Domestic Religious	6th–15th centuries	Ruins.
	Drumacoo	Ballinderreen	Religious	6th–13th centuries	Ruins.
	Drumlane Priory	Drumlane	Domestic Religious	6th–16th centuries	Also known as the Priory Church of Saint Mary and as Drumlane Abbey. Ruins.
	Duiske Abbey	Graiguenamanagh	Domestic Religious	c.1207–14th century	Also known as Graiguenamanagh Abbey.
	Dunbrody Abbey	Dunbrody, Waterford	Domestic Religious	13th–15th centuries	Ruins.
	Dunmore Abbey	Dunmore	Domestic Religious	15th century	Ruins.
	Ennis Friary	Ennis	Domestic Religious	13th century	Ruins.
	Errew Abbey	Castlehill	Domestic Religious	12th–15th centuries	Ruins.
	Ferns Cathedral	Ferns	Religious	13th–16th centuries	Also known as the Cathedral Church of St Aidan. Ruins.
	Grange Abbey	Donaghmede	Domestic Religious	13th–14th centuries	Ruins.
	Hill of Slane	Slane	Domestic Religious	–	Ruins. Includes a number of sites and buildings.
	Holy Cross Abbey	Holycross	Domestic Religious	13th century	Some of the buildings are in ruins.
	Hore Abbey	Cashel	Domestic Religious	13th century	Also known as Hoare Abbey and as St Marry's. Ruins.
	Jerpoint Abbey	Thomastown	Domestic Religious	12th century	Ruins.
	Kells Priory	Kells	Domestic Religious	12th–16th centuries	Ruins. Not to be confused with the Abbey of Kells.
	Kilconnell Abbey	Kilconnell	Domestic Religious	15th century	Also known as Kilconnell Monastery or as Kilconnell Friary. Ruins.
	Kilcooly Abbey	Gortnahoe	Domestic Religious	12th–16th centuries	Also known as the Abbey of St Mary the Virgin and St Benedict. Ruins.
	Kilcrea Friary	Ovens	Domestic Religious	15th century	Ruins.
	Kildare Cathedral	Kildare	Religious	14th–16th centuries	Also known as the Cathedral Church of St Brigid.
	Kilfenora Cathedral	Kilfenora	Religious	6th century–c.1850	Mostly in ruins.
	Killaloe Cathedral	Killaloe	Religious	1225	Also known as the Cathedral Church of St Flannan.
	Kilmallock Abbey	Kilmallock	Domestic Religious	13th–15th centuries	Also known as St Saviour's Priory. Ruins.
	Kilree	Kells	Domestic Religious	6th–16th centuries	Ruins.
	Kinalehin Friary	County Galway	Domestic Religious	c.1252–17th century	Ruins.
	Lislaughtin Abbey	Ballylongford	Domestic Religious	15th century	Ruins.
	Monasteranenagh Abbey	Dooradoyle	Domestic Religious	12th–13th centuries	Ruins.
	Moor Abbey	Galbally	Domestic Religious	15th century	Ruins.
	Moyne Abbey	Moyne Townland	Domestic Religious	c.1462	Ruins.
	Muckross Abbey	Killarney National Park	Domestic Religious	15th century	Ruins.
	Murrisk Abbey	Murrisk	Domestic Religious	15th century	Ruins.
	North Abbey	Youghal	Domestic Religious	13th century	Also known as Holy Cross Priory and as Our Lady of Graces Priory. Ruins.
	Portumna Abbey	Portumna	Domestic Religious	13th–15th centuries	Also known as the Friary Church of the Blessed Virgin Mary, the Priory Church of Saint Peter and Saint Paul, as Portumna Priory, and as Portumna Friary. Ruins.
	Quin Abbey	Quin	Domestic Religious	1402–1433	Ruins.
	Rathfran Friary	Rathfran	Domestic Religious	12th–15th centuries	Also known as the Priory of the Holy Cross and as Rathfran Priory. Ruins.
	Red Abbey	Cork	Domestic Religious	14th century	Also known as the Abbey Church of the Most Holy Trinity and as Red Abbey Tower. Ruins.
	Rock of Cashel	Cashel	Religious	12th–13th centuries	Also known as Cashel of the Kings and as St Patrick's Rock. Mostly in ruins.
	Roscrea Friary	Roscrea	Domestic Religious	15th century	Ruins.
	Ross Errilly Friary	Headford	Domestic Religious	15th century	Ruins.
	Roscommon Abbey	Roscommon	Domestic Religious	13th–15th centuries	Ruins.
	Rosserk Friary	County Mayo	Domestic Religious	15th century	Ruins.
	St Canice's Cathedral	Kilkenny	Religious	1202–1285	Also known as Kilkenny Cathedral.
	St Declan's Monastery	Ardmore	Domestic Religious	5th–14th centuries	Also known as Ardmore Cathedral.
	St Dominic's Abbey	Cashel	Domestic Religious	1480–16th century	Ruins.
	St Doulagh's Church	Balgriffin	Religious	12th–15th centuries	Oldest stone-roofed church still in use in Ireland.
	St Francis Abbey	Kilkenny	Domestic Religious	13th century	Also known as Kilkenny Grey Friary. Ruins, apart from the restored sacristy.
	St John's Priory	Kilkenny	Domestic Religious	13th–16th centuries	Also known as the Hospital of St John the Evangelist and as the Priory Church of St John. Only the Lady chapel remains intact, the rest is in ruins.
	St Laserian's Cathedral	Old Leighlin	Religious	12th–16th centuries	
	St Mary's Abbey	Dublin	Domestic Religious	846–1303	Quarried after the Dissolution of the Monasteries. Now-subterranean remains discovered in c.1880: thus far these include the chapter house and the slype. By the early 14th century, it was the largest and wealthiest religious house in Ireland.
	St Mary's Abbey	Trim	Domestic Religious	12th–15th centuries	Also known as Trim Abbey. The only remains are the Yellow Steeple and Talbot's Castle.
	St Mary's Cathedral	Limerick	Religious	1168–14th century	Also known as the Cathedral Church of the Blessed Virgin Mary.
	St Mary's Collegiate Church	Gowran	Religious	1225–15th century	Also known as the Church of the Blessed Virgin of the Assumption. Ruins.
	St Mary's Collegiate Church	Youghal	Religious	c.1220	Also known as the Collegiate Church of Saint Mary the Virgin.
	St Patrick's Cathedral	Dublin	Religious	1191–1370	
	St Seachnall's Church	Dunshaughlin	Religious	10th–12th centuries	Ruins.
	Selskar Abbey	Wexford	Domestic Religious	c.1190	Also known as the Priory of Saints Peter and Paul by Wexford and as Wexford Priory. Ruins.
	Sligo Abbey	Sligo	Domestic Religious	c.1416	Also known as the Priory of the Holy Cross and as Sligo Friary. Ruins.
	Strade Abbey	Strade	Domestic Religious	13th–14th centuries	Also known as the Priory of the Holy Cross. Ruins.
	Taghmon Church	Crookedwood	Military Religious	15th century	Also known as St Munna's Church. Ruins. Fortified church.
	Timoleague Friary	Timoleague	Domestic Religious	13th century–1510	Also known as Timoleague Abbey. Ruins.
	Tintern Abbey	Hook Peninsula	Domestic Religious	13th century	Ruins. Daughter house of Tintern Abbey in Wales.
	Trim Castle	Trim	Domestic Military	12th century	Ruins. Largest castle in Ireland.
	Trinitarian Abbey	Adare	Domestic Religious	1230–1811	Also known as White Abbey or as Holy Trinity Roman Catholic Church.

=== United Kingdom ===
==== England ====
All of the following existing Gothic buildings are either Grade I listed or scheduled monuments.

Image	Building	Place	Type	Date	Notes
	Abbey of Bury St Edmunds	Bury St Edmunds	Domestic Religious	11th–16th centuries	Also known as Bury St Edmunds Abbey. The majority of the abbey buildings are in ruins, with a few notable exceptions, including the abbey gate and the Cathedral of St James and St Edmund. The Bury St Edmunds Cross is believed to have possibly been made there.
	All Saints Church	Boltongate	Military Religious	14th century	Also known as the Parish Church of All Saints. Fortified church.
	All Saints' Church	Sutton Courtenay	Religious	12th–16th centuries	
	Alnwick Castle	Alnwick	Domestic Military Religious	11th–19th centuries	
	Angel and Royal	Grantham	Domestic	1203–2002	
	Ayshford Chapel	Ayshford	Religious	15th century	
	**Bath Abbey**	**Bath**	Domestic Religious	7th–19th centuries	Also known as the Abbey Church of Saint Peter and Saint Paul, Bath.
	Beverley Minster	Beverley	Religious	1188–1490	Also known as the Parish Church of Saint John and Saint Martin.
	Blackfriars Monastery Guest House	Canterbury	Domestic	13th century	
	Bodleian Library	Oxford	–	15th century–present	
	Bolton Abbey	Bolton Abbey	Domestic Religious	12th century	Also known as Bolton Priory. Apart from a portion of the abbey nave used as a parish church, is in ruins.
	Bridlington Priory	Bridlington	Domestic Religious	c.1113	Also known as the Priory Church of St Mary and as Bridlington Priory Church.
	Bristol Cathedral	Bristol	Religious	1220–1877	Also known as the Cathedral Church of the Holy and Undivided Trinity. Formerly known as St Augustine's Abbey.
	**Canterbury Cathedral**	**Canterbury**	Religious	1070–1834	Also known as the Cathedral and Metropolitical Church of Christ at Canterbury. Formerly known as Christ Church, Canterbury.
	Carlisle Cathedral	Carlisle	Religious	12th century	Also known as the Cathedral Church of the Holy and Undivided Trinity.
	Chester Cathedral	Chester	Religious	c.1100–c.1473	Also known as the Cathedral Church of Christ and the Blessed Virgin Mary.
	Chichester Cathedral	Chichester	Religious	1095–1500	Also known as the Cathedral Church of the Holy Trinity.
	Church of St Mary Magdalene	Newark-on-Trent	Religious	12th century–c.1220	
	Collegiate Church of St Mary	Warwick	Religious	1123–1704	
	Coventry Cathedral (First Structure)	Coventry	Religious	14th–15th centuries	Also known as the Cathedral Church of Saint Michael. Was severely damaged in the Coventry Blitz and was left a ruin.
	Dover Castle	Dover	Domestic Military Religious	12th–19th centuries	
	**Durham Castle**	Durham	Domestic Military	1072–14th century	
	**Durham Cathedral**	Durham	Religious	1093–1490	Also known as the Cathedral Church of Christ, Blessed Mary the Virgin and St Cuthbert of Durham. Contains the Shrine of St Cuthbert.
	Eastbridge Hospital	Canterbury	–	1180	Also known as the Eastbridge Hospital of St Thomas the Martyr and as the Hospital of St Thomas the Martyr of Eastbridge.
	Edington Priory	Edington	Domestic Religious	1351–1361	Also known as the Church of St Mary, St Katherine, and All Saints.
	Elenor Crosses	Lincoln to Westminster	–	1291–c.1295	Set of 12 crosses marking the route of the funereal procession of Eleanor of Castille. Located at Lincoln, Grantham, Stamford, Geddington, Hardingstone, Stony Stratford, Woburn, Dunstable, St Albans, Waltham Cross, Cheapside, and Westminster. Of the original 12, only 3 remain more-or-less intact: the crosses of Geddington, Hardingstone, and Waltham Cross.
	Ely Cathedral	Ely	Religious	1083–1375	Also known as the Cathedral Church of the Holy and Undivided Trinity. Prior to the Reformation, it was known as the Church of St Etheldreda and St Peter.
	Eton College Chapel	Eton	Religious	15th–20th centuries	
	Exeter Cathedral	Exeter	Religious	1112–1400	Also known as the Cathedral Church of Saint Peter in Exeter.
	**Fountains Abbey**	**Studley Royal Park**	Domestic Religious	1132–16th century	Ruins.
	Gisborough Priory	Guisborough	Domestic Religious	12th–14th centuries	Also known as St Mary's Priory Ruins. Ruins.
	Glastonbury Abbey	Glastonbury	Domestic Religious	8th–16th centuries	Ruins.
	Gloucester Cathedral	Gloucester	Religious	1089–1499	Also known as the Cathedral Church of St Peter and the Holy and Indivisible Trinity.
	Great Hall of Christ Church, Oxford	Christ Church, Oxford	–	16th century	
	Great Hospital	Norwich	–	c.1450	
	Grey Friars Hospital	Coventry	Domestic	1509	Also known as Ford's Hospital.
	Guildhall	Moorgate, London	Civic	c.1440	
	Harvington Hall	Harvington	Domestic Military Religious	13th–17th centuries	Includes many priest holes, including some made by Nicholas Owen.
	Hereford Cathedral	Hereford	Religious	1079– c.1250	Also known as the Cathedral of Saint Mary the Virgin and Saint Ethelbert the King.
	Holy Trinity Church	Long Melford	Religious	1467–1497	
	Hospital of St Cross	Winchester	Domestic Religious	12th–16th centuries	Also known as the Hospital of St Cross and Almshouse of Noble Poverty.
	Hospital of Saints John the Baptist and John the Evangelist	Sherborne	Domestic	1437–1448	
	Howden Minster	Howden	Religious	1285–14th century	Also known as the Minster Church of St Peter and St Paul.
	Hull Minster	Kingston upon Hull	Religious	c.1285	Formerly known as Holy Trinity Church.
	Hulne Priory	Denwick	Domestic Religious	1240–16th century	Ruins.
	John Halle's Hall	Salisbury	Domestic	15th century	Of the original building, only the hall itself remains Gothic.
	Kenilworth Castle	Kenilworth	Domestic Military	c.1120–16th century	Ruins.
	King's College Chapel	Cambridge	Religious	1446–1515	
	Lanercost Priory	Lanercost	Domestic Religious	1169–1214	Partial ruin. Includes the Church of St Mary.
	Leicester Cathedral	Leicester	Religious	1086–1867	Also known as the Cathedral Church of Saint Martin. Richard III's remains were reinterred there in 2015.
	Lichfield Cathedral	Lichfield	Religious	1195–1340	Also known as the Cathedral Church of the Blessed Virgin Mary and St Chad.
	Lincoln Cathedral	Lincoln	Religious	1072–1311	Also known as the Cathedral Church of the Blessed Virgin Mary of Lincoln, as Lincoln Minster, and as St Mary's Cathedral.
	Lindisfarne Priory	Lindisfarne	Domestic Religious	c.634–14th century	In ruins, excluding the parish church, a former Benedictine cell. Mostly Romanesque, with some Gothic portions. Location where the Lindisfarne Gospels were created.
	Magdalen College, Oxford	Oxford	–	15th–20th centuries	
	Manchester Cathedral	Manchester	Religious	1421–1882	Also known as the Cathedral and Collegiate Church of St Mary, St Denys, and St George.
	Merton College, Oxford	Oxford	–	12th–19th centuries	
	New College, Oxford	Oxford	–	14th–21st centuries	
	Newstead Abbey	Newstead	Domestic Religious	1170–1819	Formerly known as St Mary of Newstead. Partially in ruins. Ancestral home of Lord Byron.
	Norwich Cathedral	Norwich	Religious	1096–1145	Also known as the Cathedral Church of the Holy and Undivided Trinity.
	Norwich Guildhall	Norwich	Civic	1407–1413	
	The Old Bell	Malmesbury	Domestic	c.1220	Hotel and restaurant.
	Old Grammar School, Coventry	Coventry	–	12th–16th centuries	Formerly known as St John's Hospital. Once had a half-timbered portion which was torn down in 1794.
	Old London Bridge	London	Civic Religious	1176–1209	Demolished in 1831. Commissioned by Henry II. Included the Chapel of St Thomas on the Bridge. Had houses and other buildings on it until 1761.
	Old St Paul's Cathedral	London	Religious	1087–c.1350	Lost its spire in the fire of 1561. Destroyed in the Great Fire of London in 1666. Referenced in Geoffrey Chaucer's Canterbury Tales (specifically, The Miller's Tale).
	**Old Westminster Palace**	Westminster	Civic Domestic Religious	11th–19th centuries	Destroyed in the 1834 Burning of Parliament. Only the Chapel of St Mary Undercroft, cloisters, and chapter house of St Stephen's Chapel, the Jewel Tower, and Westminster Hall survive.
	Oxford Cathedral	Oxford	Religious	1160–1200	Also known as Christ Church Cathedral.
	Peterborough Cathedral	Peterborough	Religious	1118–1237	Also known as the Cathedral Church of St Peter, St Paul, and St Andrew.
	Rievaulx Abbey	Rievaulx	Domestic Religious	c.1130	Ruins.
	Ripon Cathedral	Ripon	Religious	1160–1547	Also known as the Cathedral Church of St Peter and St Wilfrid, and as Ripon Minster.
	Rochester Cathedral	Rochester	Religious	1079–1238	Also known as the Cathedral Church of Christ and the Blessed Virgin Mary.
	St Albans Cathedral	St Albans	Religious	1077–1893	Also known as the Cathedral and Abbey Church of St Alban.
	St Andrew's Church	Folkingham	Religious	12th–15th centuries	
	**St Augustine's Abbey**	Canterbury	Domestic Religious	598–16th century	Partially in ruins.
	St Botolph's Church	Boston	Religious	14th century–1520	Also known as the Boston Stump.
	St Cassian's Church	Chaddesley Corbett	Religious	12th–19th centuries	
	St Edward King and Martyr	Cambridge	Religious	13th–15th centuries	
	St Enodoc's Church	Trebetherick	Religious	12th–15th centuries	
	St James' and St Paul's Church	Marton	Religious	13th century–1804	A brick extension was added to the chancel in the 20th century.
	**St Martin's Church**	Canterbury	Religious	Before 597–17th century	
	St Mary's Abbey	Abingdon-on-Thames	Domestic Religious	7th–16th centuries	Also known as Abingdon Abbey.
	St Mary's Abbey	York	Domestic Religious	11th–16th centuries	Ruins.
	St Mary's Church	Nantwich	Religious	c.1340–c.1633	
	St Mary Redcliffe	Redcliffe	Religious	15th century	
	St Michael's Church	Baddiley	Religious	1308–1811	
	St Michael's Church	Burgh by Sands	Military Religious	12th–14th centuries	Fortified church.
	St Michael's Church	Garway	Military Religious	12th–14th centuries	Fortified church.
	St Michael's Mount	Mount's Bay	Domestic Military Religious	c.1135–14th century	
	St Michael's Tower	Glastonbury Tor	Religious	14th century	Also known as St Michael's Church Tower. Ruins. The remains of the church of a daughter house of Glastonbury Abbey.
	St Wulfram's Church	Grantham	Religious	12th century– 1550	
	Salisbury Cathedral	Salisbury	Religious	1220–1320	Also known as the Cathedral Church of the Blessed Virgin Mary. Subject of John Constable's Salisbury Cathedral from the Bishop's Grounds.
	School of Pythagoras	Cambridge	Domestic	c.1200	
	Selby Abbey	Selby	Domestic Religious	1069–1465	
	Sheffield Cathedral	Sheffield	Religious	c.1200–1966	Also known as the Cathedral Church of St Peter and St Paul.
	Sherborne Abbey	Sherborne	Domestic Religious	705–1500	Also known as Abbey Church of St Mary the Virgin.
	Shrewsbury Abbey	Shrewsbury	Domestic Religious	11th–16th centuries	Also known as the Abbey Church of Saint Peter and Saint Paul.
	Southwark Cathedral	Southwark	Religious	1106–1897	Also known as the Cathedral and Collegiate Church of St Saviour and St Mary Overie.
	Southwell Minster	Southwell	Religious	c.1108– c.1300	Also known as the Cathedral and Parish Church of the Blessed Virgin Mary.
	Syon Abbey	Isleworth, Hounslow	Domestic Religious	1426–16th century	The buildings were torn down from the dissolution to the mid-18th century and most of the material quarried, but some intact portions form part of the fabric of Syon House. At the time of the dissolution, it was among the ten wealthiest religious houses in England. Most likely had significant influence on English Gothic architecture.
	Tattershall Castle	Tattershall	Domestic Military	1231–1450	
	Taunton Minster	Taunton	Religious	c.1308–1508	Also known as St Mary Magdalene Church.
	Temple Church	Temple, London	Religious	12th–14th centuries	Also known as the Church of St Mary the Virgin.
	Tewkesbury Abbey	Tewkesbury	Domestic Religious	12th century	Also known as the Abbey Church of St Mary the Virgin.
	The Abbey	Sutton Courtenay	Domestic	13th–19th centuries	
	Tonbridge Castle	Tonbridge	Domestic Military	13th century	The Medieval portion is in ruins.
	Walsingham Priory	Walsingham	Domestic Religious	11th–15th centuries	Also known as St Marys Priory. Ruins.
	Wells Cathedral	Wells	Religious	1176– c.1490	Also known as the Cathedral Church of St Andrew.
	**Westminster Abbey**	Westminster	Domestic Religious	960–1722	Also known as the Collegiate Church of Saint Peter at Westminster. Traditional location for the coronation of English (and later British) monarchs.
	Whitby Abbey	Whitby	Domestic Religious	657–12th century	Ruins.
	Winchester Cathedral	Winchester	Religious	1079–1532	Also known as the Cathedral Church of the Holy Trinity, St Peter, St Paul, and St Swithun.
	Windsor Castle	Windsor	Domestic Military Religious	11th–19th centuries	Longest-occupied palace in Europe. Special note to St George's Chapel, being a fine example of Perpendicular Gothic.
	Worcester Cathedral	Worcester	Religious	1084–1504	Also known as the Cathedral Church of Christ and the Blessed Mary the Virgin, of Worcester.
	York City Walls	York	Military	c.71AD–14th century	The majority of the surviving portions were built in the 13th and 14th centuries, with some Classical and Romanesque remains.
	York Minster	York	Religious	c.1230–1472	Also known as the Cathedral and Metropolitical Church of Saint Peter in York.

==== Northern Ireland ====
All of the following Gothic buildings are Grade A listed, scheduled monuments, or state care monuments.

Image	Building	Place	Type	Date	Notes
	Ardtole Church	Ardtole	Religious	15th century	Also known as the Church of St Nicholas and as Ardtole Kirk. Ruins.
	Bangor Abbey	Bangor	Domestic Religious	12th–15th centuries	Only remains are St Malachy's Wall and portions of the church. The Antiphonary of Bangor was written by the monks there.
	Down Cathedral	Downpatrick	Religious	13th–15th centuries	Also known as the Cathedral Church of the Holy and Undivided Trinity.
	Dunluce Castle	County Antrim	Military	13th–17th centuries	Ruins.
	Enniskillen Castle	Enniskillen	Domestic Military	1428–16th century	Partial ruins. Houses the Fermanagh County Museum and a museum dedicated to two local regiments.
	Grey Abbey	Greyabbey	Domestic Religious	1193–15th century	Ruins.
	Inch Abbey	Downpatrick	Domestic Religious	12th century	Ruins.
	Killyleagh Castle	Killyleagh	Domestic Military	1180–19th century	Heavily renovated in the 19th century to resemble a château of the Loire.
	St Patrick's Cathedral	Armagh	Religious	12th century	Not to be confused with the Roman Catholic cathedral in the same town.
	Shane's Castle	Randalstown	Domestic Military	c.1345	Also known as Edenduffcarrick. Burnt down in 1816 and left in ruins.

==== Scotland ====
All of the following existing Gothic buildings are either Category A listed or scheduled monuments.

Image	Building	Place	Type	Date	Notes
	Brig o' Balgownie	Old Aberdeen	Civic	13th century	Also known as the Old Bridge of Don.
	Brig o' Doon	Ayrshire	Civic	15th century	Also known as Auld Brig and as Old Bridge of Doon.
	Coldingham Priory	Coldingham	Domestic Religious	12th–14th centuries	
	Corstorphine Old Parish Church	Corstorphine	Religious	15th century	Formerly known as St John's Collegiate Church.
	Crichton Collegiate Church	Crichton	Religious	15th century	
	Crossraguel Abbey	Maybole	Domestic Religious	14th century	Also known as the Abbey of St Mary of Crossraguel. Ruins.
	Drum Castle	Drumoak	Domestic Military	13th century	
	Dryburgh Abbey	Dryburgh	Domestic Religious	12th–15th centuries	Ruins.
	Dunblane Cathedral	Dunblane	Religious	11th–13th centuries	Formerly known as the Cathedral Church of St Blaan and St Laurence.
	Dunfermline Abbey	Dunfermline	Domestic Religious	1128–1250	In ruins, apart from the abbey church.
	Glasgow Cathedral	Glasgow	Religious	12th–13th centuries	Also known as St Kentigern's Cathedral, as St Mungo's Cathedral, and as the High Kirk of Glasgow.
	**Holyrood Abbey**	**Old Town**, Edinburgh	Domestic Religious	12th–17th centuries	Ruins. Depicted in Louis Daguerre's The Ruins of Holyrood Chapel.
	Iona Abbey	Iona	Domestic Religious	9th–15th centuries	Produced both the Chronicle of Ireland and the Book of Kells.
	Jedburgh Abbey	Jedburgh	Domestic Religious	12th–16th centuries	Ruins.
	Kilwinning Abbey	Kilwinning	Domestic Religious	12th–16th centuries	Ruins.
	King's College Chapel	Old Aberdeen	Religious	1498–1509	
	Ladykirk Church	Ladykirk	Religious	15th century	Also known as St Mary's Church and as the Kirk of Steill.
	Law Castle	West Kilbride	Domestic Military	c.1467	
	Melrose Abbey	Melrose	Domestic Religious	1136–1590	Also known as St Mary's Abbey. Mostly in ruins.
	Mingary Castle	Kilchoan	Domestic Military	13th–14th centuries	Ruins.
	Neidpath Castle	Peebles	Domestic Military	1263–1266	Partially in ruins.
	Old Tolbooth	**Old Town**, Edinburgh	Civic	1386–c.1400	Renovated in 1561; demolished in 1817.
	Paisley Abbey	Paisley	Domestic Religious	12th–19th centuries	
	Rosslyn Chapel	Roslin	Religious	15th century	Formerly known as the Collegiate Chapel of St Matthew.
	St Andrews Cathedral	St Andrews	Religious	1158–1318	Ruins.
	**St Giles' Cathedral**	**Old Town**, Edinburgh	Religious	1385–1410	Also known as the High Kirk of Edinburgh.
	St John's Kirk	Perth	Religious	c.1448	Also known as Old Church. The site of John Knox's 1559 sermon which began the Scottish Reformation.
	St Machar's Cathedral	Aberdeen	Religious	12th–15th centuries	Also known as Old Machar and as the High Kirk of Aberdeen.
	St Magnus Cathedral	Kirkwall	Religious	1137–15th century	
	St Moluag's Church	Eoropie	Religious	13th century	Also known as Teampall Mholuaidh.
	South Leith Parish Church	Leith	Religious	1483–1848	Originally known as the Kirk of Our Lady, St Mary.
	Trinity College Kirk	**Old Town**, Edinburgh	Religious	1460–1531	Also known as Trinity Apse. Only the apse survives. Original burial site of Mary of Guelders, wife of James II.

==== Wales ====
All of the following Gothic buildings are Grade I listed or scheduled monuments.

Image	Building	Place	Type	Date	Notes
	Abbey of St Mary	St Dogmaels	Domestic Religious	12th–13th centuries	Also known as St Dogmaels Abbey. Ruins.
	Aberconwy Abbey	Conwy	Domestic Religious	1186–1284	
	Abergavenny Castle	Abergavenny	Domestic Military	1087–14th century	Ruins.
	All Saints' Church	Gresford	Religious	13th–15th centuries	Mainly 15th century. Has the most surviving medieval stained glass of any Welsh church. Possesses a Romano-British altar, known as the Gresford Stone.
	Bangor Cathedral	Bangor	Religious	c.1120–14th century	Also known as Saint Deiniol's Cathedral in Bangor.
	Basingwerk Abbey	Holywell	Domestic Religious	12th–15th centuries	Ruins.
	**Beaumaris Castle**	Beaumaris	Military	1295–c.1330	Ruins. One of the fortifications built as part of Edward I's conquest of Wales.
	Bishop's Palace	Llandaff, Cardiff	Domestic	c.1266	Also known as Llandaff Castle or as the Old Bishop's Palace. Ruins.
	Brecon Castle	Brecon	Domestic Military	1093–1814	Ruins.
	Brecon Cathedral	Brecon	Religious	c.1215	Also known as the Cathedral Church of St John the Evangelist.
	**Caernarfon Castle**	Caernarfon	Military	11th century–1330	Ruins. One of the fortifications built as part of Edward I's conquest of Wales.
	**Caernarfon Town Walls**	Caernarfon	Military	1283–1292	Largely intact. One of the fortifications built as part of Edward I's conquest of Wales.
	Caerphilly Castle	Caerphilly	Domestic Military	1268–1290	Ruins. Largest castle in the UK after Windsor Castle.
	Caldicot Castle	Caldicot	Domestic Military	12th century	Largely in ruins.
	Chepstow Castle	Chepstow	Domestic Military	1067–1300	Ruins. Oldest surviving post-Roman stone fortification in Britain.
	Church of St Beuno and St Mary	Whitford	Religious	7th–19th centuries	
	Church of St John the Baptist	Llanblethian	Religious	12th century	
	Church of St Mary the Virgin	Llanfair Kilgeddin	Religious	13th–14th centuries	
	Church of St Nicholas	Grosmont	Religious	13th century	
	Church of St Nicholas	Trellech	Religious	c.1300	
	**Conwy Castle**	Conwy	Military	1283–1289	Ruins. One of the fortifications built as part of Edward I's conquest of Wales.
	**Conwy Town Walls**	Conwy	Military	1283–1287	Intact. One of the fortifications built as part of Edward I's conquest of Wales.
	Crickhowell Castle	Crickhowell	Domestic Military	1121–1400	Also known as Alisby's Castle. Ruins.
	Cymer Abbey	Llanelltyd	Domestic Religious	1189–13th century	Ruins.
	Denbigh Castle and Town Walls	Denbigh	Military	13th–14th centuries	Ruins.
	Dolbadarn Castle	Llanberis Pass	Domestic Military	13th century	Ruins.
	Dolforwyn Castle	Abermule	Domestic Military	13th century	Ruins.
	Grosmont Castle	Grosmont	Domestic Military	1070–1350	Ruins.
	Hafotty	Llansadwrn	Domestic	14th century	
	**Harlech Castle**	Harlech	Military	1282–1289	Ruins. One of the fortifications built as part of Edward I's conquest of Wales.
	Haverfordwest Castle	Haverfordwest	Domestic Military	1120–c.1380	Ruins.
	Hay Castle	Hay-on-Wye	Domestic Military	c.1200–17th century	Partially in ruins.
	Holt Bridge	Holt	Civic	1339	Also known as the Farndon Bridge, as the Holt-Farndon Bridge, and as the Farndon/Holt Bridge.
	Kidwelly Castle	Kidwelly	Domestic Military	12th century	Ruins.
	Lamphey Bishop's Palace	Lamphey	Domestic	13th–14th centuries	Ruins.
	Llandaff Cathedral	Llandaff, Cardiff	Religious	12th century	Also known as the Cathedral Church of Saints Peter and Paul with Saints Dyfrig, Teilo, and Euddogwy.
	Llanthony Priory	Vale of Ewyas	Domestic Religious	12th–14th centuries	Ruins, apart from Abbey Hotel, St David's Church, and Court Farm Barn.
	Llawhaden Castle	Llawhaden	Domestic Military	13th century	Ruins.
	Manorbier Castle	Manorbier	Domestic Military	12th century	Ruins.
	Margam Abbey	Margam	Domestic Religious	12th–16th centuries	Ruins. The abbey under croft and the chapter house are the surviving Gothic structures.
	Mathern Palace	Mathern	Domestic	14th–17th centuries	
	Monmouth Castle	Monmouth	Domestic Military	1067–1386	Ruins.
	Neath Abbey	Neath	Domestic Religious	12th–16th centuries	Ruins. Once was the largest abbey in Wales.
	Newport Cathedral	Newport	Religious	9th–20th centuries	Also known as St Woolos' Cathedral.
	Owain Glyndŵr's Parliament House	Machynlleth	Civic	15th–16th centuries	Building where Owain Glyndŵr held parliament after being crowned.
	Oystermouth Castle	Mumbles	Domestic Military	12th century	Ruins.
	Pembroke Castle	Pembroke	Domestic Military	1093–1241	Ruins, partially restored.
	Penallt Old Church	Penallt	Religious	c.1400	
	Porth-y-Tŵr	St Davids	Military	13th century	
	Priory Church of St Mary	Abergavenny	Domestic Religious	1070–1535	Also referred to as the "Westminster of Wales" for its size and numerous high-status tomb monuments and effigies.
	Priory Church of St Mary	Usk	Domestic Religious	12th century–1900	
	Raglan Castle	Raglan	Domestic Military	15th–17th centuries	Ruins.
	Ruthin Castle	Ruthin	Domestic Military	c.1277	The medieval section is in ruins.
	Sailors' Chapel	Angle	Religious	1447	Also known as the Seamen's Chapel and as the Fishermen's Chapel.
	St Andrew's Church	Presteigne	Religious	9th century–1868	
	St Asaph Cathedral	St Asaph	Religious	13th—19th centuries	Also known as the Cathedral Church of Saints Asaph and Cyndeyrn.
	St Cadoc's Church	Llancarfan	Religious	13th century	
	St Davids Cathedral	St Davids	Religious	1181–13th century	
	St Davids Bishops Palace	St Davids	Domestic	13th–14th centuries	Ruins.
	St Donat's Castle	St Donats	Domestic Military	12th century–present	Presently part of Atlantic College. 20th-century restoration includes the majority of Bradenstoke Priory.
	St Donat's Church	St Donats	Religious	12th–20th centuries	
	St Illtyd's Church	Llantwit Major	Religious	11th–15th centuries	The site was originally the location of the chapel for St Illtyd's College, Britain's earliest centre of learning.
	St John the Baptist Church	Cardiff	Religious	1180–1891	
	St John the Baptist Church	Porthcawl	Religious	c.1180–1993	
	St Martin's Church	Cwmyoy	Religious	12th–14th centuries	
	St Mary's Church	Derwen	Religious	13th century	
	St Mary's Church	Kidwelly	Religious	c.1320	
	St Mary's Church	Llanfair-ar-y-bryn	Religious	12th century	
	St Mary's Church	Magor	Religious	13th century	
	St Mary's Church	Mold	Religious	c.1490–2001	
	St Mary's Church	Welshpool	Religious	c.1250–1871	
	St Mellons Church	Old St Mellons	Religious	13th century	Also known as St Mellons Parish Church. Formerly known as St Melan's Church.
	St Michael's Church	Myddfai	Religious	14th–15th centuries	
	St Michael and All Angels Church	Colwinston	Religious	1111	
	St Michael and All Angels Church	Kerry	Religious	1176–1883	
	St Padarn's Church	Llanbadarn Fawr	Religious	1115–2001	
	St Peter's Church	Carmarthen	Religious	14th century	
	St Tathan's Church	St Athan	Religious	13th–14th centuries	
	St Teilo's Church	Llantilio Crossenny	Religious	13th century	
	St Winefride's Well	Holywell	Religious	15th century	
	Swansea Castle	Swansea	Military	1107	Ruins.
	Tintern Abbey	Tintern	Domestic Religious	1131–15th century	Also known as the Abbey Church of St Mary. Ruins. Was referenced by numerous works of art and literature beginning in the 18th century.
	Tretower Castle	Tretower	Domestic Military	12th–13th centuries	Ruins.
	Tretower Court	Tretower	Domestic	14th century	
	Tudor Merchant's House	Tenby	Domestic	15th century	
	Tŷ Mawr	Castle Caereinion	Domestic	13th century	
	Usk Castle	Usk	Domestic Military	1120–c.1680	Mostly ruins.
	Valle Crucis Abbey	Llantysilio	Domestic Religious	1201–15th century	Also known as the Abbey Church of the Blessed Virgin Mary, Valle Crucis. Ruins.
	Weobley Castle	Gower	Domestic Military	14th century	Partially in ruins.

=== Crown Dependencies ===
Although not part of the UK and only partially part of the British Isles, the Crown Dependencies are under British rule, thus their inclusion here.

All of the following existing Gothic buildings are Manx heritage sites, Jersey Grade 1 listed buildings, Guernsey protected monuments, or Alderney protected monuments.

Image	Building	Place	Territory	Type	Date	Notes
	Abbey of St Helier	Saint Helier	Jersey	Domestic Religious	c.550–16th century	Also known as the Priory of St Helier. Most associated structures destroyed to make way for Elizabeth Castle; the Gothic remains are limited to the Hermitage Chapel.
	Castle Rushen	Castletown	Isle of Man	Domestic Military Religious	10th–18th centuries	
	Chapel of St Apolline	Saint Saviour	Guernsey	Religious	1392	Also known as St Apolline's Chapel.
	Church of St Helier	Saint Helier	Jersey	Religious	11th–19th centuries	Also known as the Parish Church of St Helier.
	Grosnez Castle	Saint Ouen	Jersey	Domestic Military	14th century	Ruins.
	Grouville Church	Grouville	Jersey	Religious	12th–15th centuries	Also known as St Martin de Grouville.
	La Hougue Bie Chapel	Grouville	Jersey	Religious	12th century	
	Lihou Priory	Saint Peter	Guernsey	Domestic Religious	12th–16th centuries	Also known as the Priory of Our Lady of Lihou. Ruins.
	Mont Orgueil	St Martin	Jersey	Domestic Military	1204–20th century	Also known as Gorey Castle and as lé Vièr Châté.
	Peel Castle	St Patrick's Isle	Isle of Man	Domestic Military Religious	11th–19th centuries	Ruins.
	Rushen Abbey	Ballasalla	Isle of Man	Domestic Religious	1134–1350	Ruins. The Chronicles of Mann were compiled at the abbey.
	St Anne's Church	Saint Anne	Guernsey	Religious	12th–13th centuries	Demolished in circa 1850 and replaced with present structure. Church of the only parish on Alderney.
	St Brelade's Church	Saint Brelade	Jersey	Religious	10th–15th centuries	
	St Clement's Parish Church	St Clement	Jersey	Religious	10th–15th centuries	Also known as the Parish Church of St Clement.
	Saint-Jean des Chênes	St John	Jersey	Religious	12th century	Also known as St John's Parish Church and as St John of the Oaks.
	St Martin le Vieux	St Martin	Jersey	Religious	12th–15th centuries	Also known as St Martin's Parish Church.
	St Michel du Valle	Vale	Guernsey	Religious	11th century	Also known as the Vale Church.
	St Tugual's Chapel	Herm	Guernsey	Religious	11th century	
	Vale Castle	Vale	Guernsey	Domestic Military	10th–15th centuries	Also known as Le Château St Michel, as Château de Val, and as Château de Valle. Significant portions of the structure was destroyed by the Nazis during WWII.

== Central Europe ==
=== Austria ===
All of the following existing Gothic buildings are Denkmalgeschützt Objekte.

Image	Building	Place	Type	Date	Notes
	Aggsbach Charterhouse	Aggsbach	Religious	c.1380	Remains of a former Carthusian monastery.
	Aggstein Castle	Wachau	Military	12th century	Ruins.
	Altenburg Abbey	Altenburg	Domestic Religious	1144–1733	The surviving medieval structures are underground.
	Augustinian Church	Innere Stadt, Vienna	Religious	1327–1339	
	Bummerlhaus	Steyr	Domestic	13th century	
	Burg Deutschlandsberg	Deutschlandsberg	Domestic Military	12th century	Ruins.
	Burg Heidenreichstein	Heidenreichstein	Domestic Military	12th–16th centuries	
	Burg Kreuzenstein	Leobendorf	Domestic Military Religious	12th–19th centuries	Constructed on and from the remains of a medieval castle using an assemblage of portions of other ruined castles.
	Burg Lockenhaus	Lockenhaus	Domestic Military Religious	c.1200	
	Burg Perchtoldsdorf	Perchtoldsdorf	Domestic Military Religious	11th–19th centuries	
	Burg Rappottenstein	Rappottenstein	Domestic Military	c.1150–c.1600	Considered to be among the best preserved castles in Austria.
	Burg Vichtenstein	Vichtenstein	Domestic Military	12th–20th centuries	
	Church of Saint Michael	Innere Stadt, Vienna	Religious	c.1220–c.1240	
	Die Bachschmiede	Wals-Siezenheim	–	1567	
	Feldkirch Cathedral	Feldkirch	Religious	c.1200–1520	Also known as the Cathedral of St Nicholas.
	Franciscan Church	Graz	Religious	13th–14th centuries	Also known as the Franciscan Monastery of Graz and as the Parish Church of the Assumption of the Virgin Mary in Graz. Surviving Gothic portions of the monastic complex include the church building, the cloisters, the chapel of St James, and portions of the library old building.
	**Franciscan Church**	**Old Town**, Salzburg	Religious	8th century–1498	
	Goldener Adler	Old Town, Innsbruck	Domestic	1390	Traditional inn. Notable guests include Emperor Charles V, Leopold and Wolfgang Mozart, Goethe, Ludwig I of Bavaria, and Niccolò Paganini.
	Goldenes Dachl	Old Town, Innsbruck	Domestic	c.1500	Built to commemorate the marriage of Maximilian I to Bianca Maria Sforza.
	Göss Abbey	Leoben	Domestic Religious	1004–1782	The church is also known as the Parish Church of St Andrew the Apostle. The surviving church is largely Gothic, although the crypt is Romanesque. The majority of the surviving abbey structures date from later periods.
	**Graz Cathedral**	Graz	Religious	1438–1462	Also known as St Giles' Cathedral.
	Grinzing Parish Church	Grinzing, Döbling, Vienna	Religious	1417–1426	
	Heiligenkreuz Abbey	Heiligenkreuz	Domestic Religious	1133–1240	Also known as the Abbey of the Holy Cross. The oldest continuously occupied Cistercian monastery in the world.
	Hohensalzburg Fortress	Salzburg	Military Religious	1077–17th century	Includes a Gothic castle chapel.
	Hohenwerfen Castle	Werfen	Military	1075–1078	
	**Hotel Goldener Hirsch**	**Old Town**, Salzburg	Domestic	15th century	
	Lilienfeld Abbey	Lilienfeld	Domestic Religious	1202–c.1810	
	Maltese Church	Innere Stadt, Vienna	Religious	15th century–1857	Only the interior remains Gothic.
	**Maria am Gestade**	Innere Stadt, Vienna	Religious	1394–1414	Also known as Maria Stiegen.
	Maria Saal Cathedral	Maria Saal	Military Religious	1430–1459	Also known as the Pilgrimage Church of the Assumption of the Virgin Mary. Fortified church.
	Mauterndorf Castle	Mauterndorf	Military	c.1253	
	**Minoritenkirche**	Innere Stadt, Vienna	Religious	1276–1350	Also known as the Friars Minor Conventual Church. Formerly known as the Italian National Church of Mary of the Snows.
	Moosham Castle	Unternberg	Domestic Military	c.1191–1495	
	Neuberg Abbey	Neuberg an der Mürz	Domestic Religious	1327–1496	
	**Nonnberg Abbey**	**Old Town**, Salzburg	Domestic Religious	c.714–c.1880	Oldest continuously extant convent in the Germanophone world. Has an altar piece by Veit Stoß.
	Passauer Hof	Ybbs an der Donau	Domestic	13th–14th centuries	Also known as the Former Palace of Ybbsburg.
	Pilgrimage Church Maria Straßengel	Judendorf-Straßengel	Religious	1346–1355	
	Riegersburg Castle	Riegersburg	Domestic Military	c.1122–1653	Owned by the House of Liechtenstein.
	**St Blasius' Church**	**Old Town**, Salzburg	Religious	1185–1330	
	St George's Cathedral	Wiener Neustadt	Religious	1440–1616	
	St Laurence's Church	Ybbs an der Donau	Religious	1200–1466	
	St Stephan's Church	Baden bei Wien	Religious	15th century	The organ was played by Mozart and possibly Beethoven. Ave verum corpus premiered in the church in 1791.
	**St Stephen's Cathedral**	Innere Stadt, Vienna	Religious	1137–1578	Also known as the Cathedral and Metropolitan Church of St Stephen and All Saints. Contains numerous great works of art.
	Säusenstein Abbey Chapel	Ybbs an der Donau	Religious	14th century	Also known as the Chapel of Thérèse of Lisieux.
	Seitenstetten Abbey Church	Seitenstetten	Religious	12th–15th centuries	
	Spinnerin am Kreuz	Austria	–	1375–1384	One is in Favoriten, Vienna while the other is in Wiener Neustadt.
	Tratzberg Castle	Jenbach	Domestic Military	c.1500	
	Wiener Neustadt Cathedral	Wiener Neustadt	Religious	1192–15th century	Also known as the Cathedral of the Assumption of Mary and St Rupert.
	Wiesberg Castle	Tobadill	Domestic Military	13th century	
	Zwettl Abbey	Zwettl	Domestic Religious	1137–1747	

=== Czech Republic ===
All of the following existing Gothic buildings are cultural monuments of the Czech Republic.

Image	Building	Place	Type	Date	Notes
	**Bethlehem Chapel**	Old Town, Prague	Religious	c.1391	Place where Jan Hus served as priest prior to his excommunication.
	Bezděz Castle	Bezděz	Domestic Military Religious	c.1260–1280	Ruins. Laid to waste during the Thirty Years' War.
	Brno Old Town Hall	Brno	Civic	1304–1729	
	**Český Krumlov Castle**	**Český Krumlov**	Domestic Military Religious	13th–19th centuries	
	Český Šternberk Castle	Český Šternberk	Domestic Military	1241 – 16th century	
	Cathedral of the Holy Spirit	Hradec Králové	Religious	1307–1463	
	**Chapel of St Ludmila of Bohemia**	**Prague Castle**, Prague	Religious	14th century	A subsequent addition to the Romanesque **St George's Basilica**.
	**Charles Bridge**	Old Town, Prague	Civic	1357 – 15th century	Replaced the Romanesque Judith's Bridge, which had been severely damaged in a 1342 flood. Includes three towers: the Old Town Bridge Tower and two towers within the Malá Strana Bridge Tower.
	**Church of Our Lady Before Týn**	Old Town, Prague	Religious	14th century – c.1455	Also known as the Parish Church of the Mother of God Before Týn and as Týn Church.
	**Church of Our Lady of the Snows**	New Town, Prague	Religious	1347–1625	Never completed. Site of the martyrdom of the Fourteen Prague Martyrs.
	**Church of Our Lady on the Lawn**	New Town, Prague	Religious	1360–1375	Also known as the Church of the Annunciation of the Virgin Mary on the Lawn and as the Orthodox Church of the Annunciation of the Most Holy Theotokos.
	Church of Saint Anne	Horšovský Týn	Religious	1507–1516	
	**Church of St Apollinaire**	New Town, Prague	Religious	c.1360–1390	
	Church of St Bartholomew	Kolín	Religious	13th century – 1504	
	Church of Saint Giles	Milevsko	Religious	12th–15th centuries	Filial church of Milevsko Monastery.
	Church of St James the Great	Brno	Religious	13th–15th centuries	
	Church of St James the Great	Jihlava	Religious	1256–1436	
	Church of St James the Greater	Kutná Hora	Religious	14th–15th centuries	
	Church of St James the Greater	Prachatice	Religious	14th century – 1513	
	**Church of St Martin in the Wall**	Old Town, Prague	Religious	1178–1488	Fortified church.
	Church of Saint Maurice	Olomouc	Religious	15th century	
	Church of Saint Nicholas	Starý Svojanov	Religious	13th–14th centuries	
	Church of Saint Nicholas	Znojmo	Religious	1388 – 16th century	
	**Church of St Peter at Poříčí**	New Town, Prague	Religious	12th–19th centuries	
	Church of Saint Vitus	Soběslav	Religious	1375 – 18th century	
	Church of Saints Peter and Paul	Mělník	Religious	11th–16th centuries	
	Church of the Annunciation of the Virgin Mary	Pardubice	Religious	1359–1515	
	Church of the Assumption of the Virgin Mary	Chomutov	Religious	1330–1585	
	Church of the Assumption of the Virgin Mary	Most	Religious	1253–1602	
	**Church of the Assumption of the Virgin Mary and St Charles the Great**	New Town, Prague	Religious	1351–1711	
	**Church of the Holy Spirit**	Josefov, Prague	Religious	14th century–1833	
	Church of the Virgin Mary at Náměti	Kutná Hora	Religious	c.1350 – 15th century	Also known as Dolní kostel.
	City walls of Nymburk	Nymburk	Military	13th century	
	**Convent of St Agnes of Bohemia**	New Town, Prague	Domestic Religious	c.1231 – 14th century	
	Dominican Monastery	České Budějovice	Domestic Religious	13th century – 1885	Largely burnt down in the 18th century; surviving Gothic buildings include the church and cloisters.
	Franciscan Monastery	Kadaň	Domestic Religious	15th–18th centuries	Also known as the Franciscan Monastery of the Fourteen Holy Helpers in Kadaň.
	Franciscan Monastery	Plzeň	Domestic Religious	c.1300–1611	
	Hukvaldy Castle	Hukvaldy	Domestic Military Religious	c.1234	Ruins.
	**Italian Court**	Kutná Hora	Civic Domestic Religious	13th–16th centuries	Originally the seat of the Central Mint of Prague.
	Kadaň Castle	Kadaň	Domestic Military	13th century – 1755	
	Karlštejn Castle	Karlštejn	Domestic Military Religious	1348–1365	One of the locations where the Imperial Regalia and Bohemian Crown Jewels were kept prior to 1791.
	**Karolinum**	Old Town, Prague	Domestic	1383–1386	Part of the University of Prague. Among the oldest university dormitories in Central Europe.
	Kašperk Castle	Kašperské Hory	Military	1356–1361	Ruins.
	Křivoklát Castle	Křivoklát	Domestic Military Religious	c.1230 – 19th century	Damaged by a fires in 1422 and reconstructed in 1471, giving the building its present form. It also suffered from fires in 1643 and 1826, and was repaired in 1860.
	Kunětická hora Castle	Ráby	Domestic Military Religious	14th century – 1993	
	Milevsko Monastery	Milevsko	Domestic Religious	1191–1885	Oldest monastery in South Bohemian Region. Includes the Church of the Visitation of the Virgin Mary.
	**Old New Synagogue**	Josefov, Prague	Religious	c.1270	Sometimes referred to as Old Synagogue after the other building in Prague by that name was demolished. According to legend, the body of a golem made by Rabbi Judah Loew ben Bezalel lies in the attic.
	**Old Royal Palace**	**Prague Castle**, Prague	Civic Domestic Religious	12th century – 1502	Includes Vladislav Hall and All Saints Church, among other features.
	Old Synagogue	Josefov, Prague	Religious	11th–18th centuries	Rebuilt several times. Demolished in 1867 and replaced with the Spanish Synagogue on the same site.
	Orlík Castle	Orlík nad Vltavou	Domestic Military	13th–19th centuries	The oldest surviving portion dates to the 14th century. Was extensively repaired and modified following a fire in 1508. Was originally a spur castle 200 ft above the Vltava, but is now considerably closer due to the creation of the Orlík Reservoir.
	Osek Monastery	Osek	Domestic Religious	13th–18th centuries	Largely rebuilt in the 17th or 18th centuries, although the cloisters remain original.
	Opava Cathedral	Opava	Religious	13th–18th centuries	Also known as Our Lady of the Assumption Co-Cathedral.
	Pernštejn Castle	Nedvědice	Domestic Military Religious	1270 – 16th century	Castle of the Pernštejn family.
	**Pinkas Synagogue**	Josefov, Prague	Religious	16th century	Second oldest surviving synagogue in Prague.
	Písek Stone Bridge	Písek	Civic	13th century	Oldest preserved Gothic bridge in Czechia.
	Plzeň Cathedral	Plzeň	Religious	14th–15th centuries	Also known as the Cathedral of St Bartholomew.
	Porta coeli Convent	Předklášteří	Domestic Religious	13th century – 1901	Only functioning Cistercian convent in the Czech Republic.
	**Powder Gate**	Old Town, Prague	Civic Military	1475 – 19th century	Also known as the Powder Tower. Replaced the Gate of St Ambrose and Horska Gate, which had previously stood on the site. One of the thirteen surviving city gates of Prague's Old Town and part of Prague's fortifications.
	**Prague New Town Hall**	New Town, Prague	Civic	1377–1743	Technically is New Town Town Hall or the Town Hall of New Town. Site of the 1419 Defenestration of Prague, which sparked the Hussite Wars, and one of the two sites of the 1483 Defenestration of Prague.
	**Prague Old Town Hall**	Old Town, Prague	Civic Domestic	14th–20th centuries	Began as a modified house, with other structures and houses added on and to the building subsequently. Has been modified and repaired several times, including the addition and destruction of entire wings. Technically is Old Town Town Hall or the Town Hall of Old Town. Includes the Prague Astronomical Clock. One of the two sites of the 1483 Defenestration of Prague.
	Roudnice nad Labem Augustinian Monastery	Roudnice nad Labem	Domestic Religious	1333–1734	
	**St Barbara's Church**	Kutná Hora	Religious	1388–1905	
	**Saint Castulus' Church**	Old Town, Prague	Religious	1375–1399	Gothic church with Romanesque and Baroque elements.
	Saint Giles' Church	Nymburk	Religious	13th century	
	**St Michael's Church in Jircháře**	New Town, Prague	Religious	1369 – 19th century	
	St. Nicholas Church	Louny	Religious	1517–1538	Built on the site of the burnt-down 13th-century Church of the Exhalation of the Holy Cross.
	St. Nicholas Church (Medieval structure)	Malá Strana, Prague	Religious	13th century	The original Gothic building was torn down in the 17th century to build the present structure.
	St Procopius' Church	Žďár nad Sázavou	Religious	13th–15th centuries	
	**St Stephen's Church**	New Town, Prague	Religious	14th century	
	St Thomas's Abbey	Brno	Domestic Religious	1323 – 19th century	Includes the Basilica of the Assumption of Our Lady. Place where Gregor Mendel performed his experiments.
	**St Vitus' Cathedral**	**Prague Castle**, Prague	Religious	1344–1929	Also known as the Metropolitan Cathedral of Saints Vitus, Wenceslaus, and Adalbert and as Prague Cathedral. Contains the tombs of many Bohemian kings and Holy Roman Emperors. One of the locations where the Imperial Regalia were kept prior to 1791.
	**St Vitus' Church**	**Český Krumlov**	Religious	1407–1438	
	Saint Wenceslas' Cathedral	Olomouc	Religious	1107 – 14th century	
	**St Wenceslas' Church**	Zderaz, New Town, Prague	Religious	12th century	
	**Sedlec Abbey**	Kutná Hora	Domestic Religious	c.1142 – 15th century	Of the original Gothic monastery buildings, only the abbey church, the **Church of the Assumption of Our Lady and Saint John the Baptist**, survived the 1421 burning by the Hussites. Restored from ruins in the 17th century.
	Sirotčí hrádek	Klentnice	Domestic Military	13th century	Ruins.
	Špilberk Castle	Brno	Domestic Military Religious	13th–14th centuries	
	**Stone Bell House**	Old Town, Prague	Domestic	14th century	Remains of a larger house. Presently houses the Gallery of the Capital City of Prague, which belongs to the National Gallery Prague.
	Strahov Monastery	Strahov, Prague	Domestic Religious	12th–17th centuries	Significantly damaged by the Hussite Wars in 1420; a few Gothic structures remain intact, including the abbey churches, the Basilica of the Assumption and the Church of St Roch.
	Švihov Castle	Švihov	Domestic Military Religious	14th century–1489	
	Teplá Abbey	Teplá	Domestic Religious	1193 – 19th century	Portions of the church remain Gothic.
	Točník Castle	Točník	Domestic Military Religious	1395–1398	Partial ruins.
	**Třebíč Castle**	Třebíč	Domestic Military Religious	13th–16th centuries	Also known as the Benedictine Monastery in Třebíč. Includes St Procopius Basilica. Romano-Gothic structure, most of which has substantial later modifications, with the exception of the church. Surviving Gothic portions include the church (especially the interior), cellars, and abbey walls.
	Třeboň Monastery	Třeboň	Domestic Religious	1367–1750	
	Veveří Castle	Brno	Domestic Military	c.1059 – 14th century	
	Vyšší Brod Cistercian Abbey	Vyšší Brod	Domestic Religious	1259 – 15th century	Also known as Hohenfurth Abbey and as Vyšší Brod Monastery. Important centre of traditional Catholicism in Czechia.
	Zbraslav Monastery (Medieval structure)	Zbraslav, Prague	Domestic Religious	1292 – late 14th century	Was severely damaged during the Hussite Wars and was demolished and rebuilt in the 17th century. Formerly the royal burial ground of the kings of Bohemia from its founding until the construction of St Vitus' Cathedral. Peter of Zittau wrote the Zbraslav Chronicle during his tenure as abbot of the abbey. Owner and former home of the Madonna of Zbraslav.
	Žebrák Castle	Točník	Domestic Military	c.1250–c.1380	Ruins
	Zlatá Koruna Monastery	Zlatá Koruna	Domestic Religious	13th–18th centuries	Includes the Chapel of Holy Guardian Angels.
	Znojmo Town Hall Tower	Znojmo	Civic	1445–1448	
	Zvíkov Castle	Zvíkovské Podhradí	Domestic Military Religious	13th century	Also referred to as the "king of Czech castles." Intact, with the exception of a few rooms. Among the most important early-Gothic Czech castles.

=== Germany ===
All of the following existing Gothic buildings are Kulturdenkmaler.

Image	Building	Place	Type	Date	Notes
	**Aachen Cathedral**	Aachen	Religious		Also known as the Imperial Cathedral. Formerly known as the Royal Cathedral of St Mary at Aachen. Oldest cathedral in Northern Europe.
	Albrechtsburg	Meissen	Domestic Military Religious	1471–1495	Birthplace of diamond vaulting.
	Alte Nahebrücke	Bad Kreuznach	Civic Domestic	c.1300–1612	
	Altenberg Abbey	Solms	Domestic Religious		
	Altenberg Cathedral	Altenberg	Religious		Also known as Altenberger Dom and as Bergischer Dom. Former abbey church of Altenberg Abbey.
	Bäckerhaus	Eppingen	Domestic	c.1412	
	**Bamberg Cathedral**	**Bamberg**	Religious	1002–1242	Also known as the Cathedral Church of St Peter and St George. The upper portions of the four towers are Gothic.
	Bamberg Dominican Monastery	**Bamberg**	Domestic Religious	1310–17th century	
	Basilica of St Castor	Koblenz	Religious		Mostly Romanesque, but with some Gothic additions.
	Bebenhausen Abbey	Bebenhausen	Domestic Religious		
	Brandenburg Cathedral	Brandenburg an der Havel	Religious	1165–15th century	Also known as the Cathedral of Sts Peter and Paul.
	Bremen Cathedral	Altstadt, Bremen	Religious	11th century–1511	Also known as St Peter's Cathedral.
	**Bremen City Hall**	Altstadt, Bremen	Civic	1400–1683	
	Brunswick Cathedral	Braunschweig	Religious	1173–1472	Also known as the Collegiate Church of Sts Blaise and John the Baptist. Mostly Romanesque, but with some Gothic additions.
	Chorin Abbey	Chorin	Domestic Religious	1258–1817	
	Church of St Martin	Lauingen	Religious	8th century–1576	
	**Cologne Cathedral**	Cologne	Religious	1248–1880	Also known as the Cathedral Church of St Peter. The construction was halted from 1560–1842.
	Doberan Abbey	Bad Doberan	Domestic Religious		
	Eberbach Abbey	Eltville	Domestic Religious		
	Erfurt Cathedral	Erfurt	Religious	12th–15th centuries	Also known as the Cathedral Church of St Mary at Erfurt and as St Mary's Cathedral.
	Frankfurt Cathedral	Frankfurt	Religious		Also known as the Imperial Cathedral of St Bartholomew.
	Frauenkirche	Munich	Religious		
	Frauenkirche	Nuremberg	Religious		
	Freiburg Minster	Freiburg im Breisgau	Religious		Also known as the Cathedral of Our Lady.
	Hanover Old Town Hall	Hanover	Civic	1410	
	Hirsau Abbey	Hirsau	Domestic Religious	c.765–1516	Also known as Hirsau Abbey. Laid to ruin in 1692; aside from the Lady Chapel the remains are in ruins.
	Hohenzollern Castle	Bisingen	Domestic Military Religious	1454–19th century	The first castle was destroyed in 1423; the second castle was mostly destroyed in the mid-18th century. Only the Chapel of St Michael remains complete. The present structure is a combination of the remains of the second castle and 19th-century Neo-Gothic replacements. Ancestral seat of the House of Hohenzellern.
	Jerichow Monastery	Jerichow	Domestic Religious		Towers.
	Konstanz Minster	Konstanz	Religious		
	Krämerbrücke	Erfurt	Civic Domestic	1325–1486	Temporally, the longest continually-inhabited bridge in Europe.
	Kriebstein Castle	Kriebstein	Domestic Military Religious	c.1384–17th century	
	Lehnin Abbey	Kloster Lehnin	Domestic Religious	1180–16th century	
	Lichtenberg Castle	Thallichtenberg	Domestic Military Religious		
	**Liebfrauenkirche**	Trier	Religious		
	Limburg Abbey	Bad Dürkheim	Domestic Religious		One of the locations where the Imperial Regalia were kept prior to 1791.
	Limburg Cathedral	Limburg an der Lahn	Religious		
	**Lübeck Cathedral**	**Altstadt**, Lübeck	Religious	1173–1335	Also known as the Proto-Cathedral of Sts John the Baptist, Blaise, Mary, and Nicholas.
	Lübeck City Fortifications	**Altstadt**, Lübeck	Civic Military	12th–15th centuries	Surviving portions include Burgtor (1444) and **Holstentor** (1464).
	**Lübeck Town Hall**	**Altstadt**, Lübeck	Civic	1240–1953	One of the largest town halls in Germany.
	Magdeburg Cathedral	Magdeburg	Religious		Also known as the Cathedral of Saints Maurice and Catherine.
	Marienkirche	Neubrandenburg	Religious		
	Markgröningen Town Hall	Markgröningen	Civic	1441	
	Meissen Cathedral	Meissen	Religious	1250–1410	Also known as the Church of St John and St Donatus.
	**Michaelsberg Abbey**	**Bamberg**	Domestic Religious	1015–18th century	
	Münster Cathedral	Münster	Religious		
	Munich City Fortifications	Altstadt, Munich	Military	12th–17th centuries	Mostly dismantled in the 18th century. Survivals include Isartor, Karlstor, and Sendlinger Tor.
	**Naumburg Cathedral**	Naumburg	Religious		Also known as the Cathedral of Sts Peter and Paul.
	Neubrandenburg City Walls	Neubrandenburg	Military	13th–14th centuries	The walls and their gates have been preserved in their entirety. Best preserved brick Gothic fortification in Europe.
	Nuremberg Castle	Nuremberg	Domestic Military Religious	c.1000–1545	One of the locations where the Imperial Regalia were kept prior to 1791.
	Nuremberg City Hall	Nuremberg	Civic	1332–1622	
	Paderborn Cathedral	Paderborn	Religious		
	**Quedlinburg Abbey**	Quedlinburg	Domestic Religious	936–1708	Includes the Collegiate Church of St Servatius, also known as Quedlinburg Cathedral. Portions are Gothic, mainly the apse.
	Regensburg Cathedral	Regensburg	Religious		Also known as St Peter's Cathedral.
	St Andrew's Church	Hildesheim	Religious		
	St Elizabeth's Church	Marburg	Religious		
	St Gangolf's Church	Trier	Religious		
	St John's Church	Bremen	Religious		
	St Lorenz's Church	Nuremberg	Religious		
	St Martin's Church	Landshut	Religious		
	**St Mary's Church**	**Altstadt**, Lübeck	Religious		
	**St Mary's Church**	Stralsund	Religious		
	St Mary's Church	Rostock	Religious		
	St. Nicholas Church	Stralsund	Religious		
	St. Nicholas Church	Wismar	Religious		
	St Sebaldus' Church	Nuremberg	Religious	1225–17th century	
	St Thomas' Church	Leipzig	Religious	12th century–1702	
	Schlenkerla	**Bamberg**	–	c.1405	
	Schloss Vollrads	Oestrich-Winkel	Domestic Military	14th century–c.1700	
	**Stolzenfels Castle**	Koblenz	Domestic Military Religious	1242–1418	Fell to ruins in the 17th century and was restored in Neo-Gothic fashion in 1842.
	Ulm Minster	Ulm	Religious		Tallest church in the world.
	Worms Synagogue	Worms	Religious	1034–1355	Destroyed during Kristallnacht; carefully reconstructed in 1961. Among the oldest synagogues in Germany.
	Xanten Cathedral	Xanten	Religious	1263–1544	Also known as St Victor's Cathedral.

=== Hungary ===
All of the following existing Gothic buildings are either cultural heritage monuments of Hungary or world heritage sites.

Image	Building	Place	Type	Date	Notes
	**Buda Castle**	Budapest	Domestic Military Religious	14th–15th centuries	Mostly destroyed after 1686. Some rooms were unearthed and reconstructed during the post-war rebuilding of Buda Castle. Includes the Palace Chapel, Stephen's Tower, and the Gothic Hall. One of the locations where the Imperial Regalia were kept prior to 1791.
	Castle of Diósgyőr	Diósgyőr, Miskolc	Domestic Military Religious	12th–21st centuries	Rebuilt from significant remains in 2014.
	Church of the Annunciation	Türje	Religious	13th century	
	Church of Mary Magdalene	Budapest	Religious	13th–15th centuries	Ruins.
	Goat Church	Sopron	Religious	13th–14th centuries	Also known as the Church of the Assumption.
	Gothic Protestant Church of Avas	Miskolc	Religious	13th century–1557	
	Mary Magdalene's Church	Sopronbánfalva	Religious	12th–14th centuries	
	Matthias' Church	Budapest	Religious	11th–15th centuries	Also known as the Church of the Assumption of Buda Castle or as the Coronation Church of Buda.
	Nyírbátor Calvinist Church	Nyírbátor	Religious	14th–15th centuries	
	Nyírbátor Catholic Minorite Church	Nyírbátor	Religious	145–17th centuries	Also known as the Church of Our Lady.
	St Emeric's Church	Egyházasdengeleg	Religious	11th–12th centuries	
	St Michael's Church	Sopron	Religious	13th century	
	Somogyvámos Church Ruins	Somogyvámos	Religious	13th century	Ruins. Only surviving structure of Csopak village which was destroyed during the period of Ottoman rule.
	Új Street 16	Sopron	Domestic	15th century	
	Visegrád Castle	Visegrád	Domestic Military Religious	1246–1251	Ruins. One of the locations where the Imperial Regalia were kept prior to 1791.

=== Liechtenstein ===
All of the following existing Gothic buildings are Kulturgüter Liechtenstein.

Image	Building	Place	Type	Date	Notes
	Bendern Parish Church	Bendern	Religious	8th–20th centuries	
	Church of St Peter	Schaan	Religious	c.1289–19th century	Also known as the Chapel of St Peter.
	Gutenberg Castle	Balzers	Domestic Military	c.1110–1912	
	Obere Burg	Schellenberg	Domestic Military	13th–16th centuries	Ruins.
	Vaduz Castle	Vaduz	Domestic Military	12th century–1640	Official residence of the Prince of Liechtenstein.

=== Romania ===
All of the following existing Gothic buildings are monumente istorice.

Image	Building	Place	Type	Date	Notes
	**Biertan Fortified Church**	Biertan	Military Religious	1468–1524	Fortified church.
	Biserica Neagră	Brașov	Religious	1383–1476	Also known as the Black Church. Formerly known as the Church of St Mary. Contrary to popular belief, the church's colour is not due to the 1689 Brașov fire but pollution. Largest church in Transylvania.
	**Câlnic Fortress**	Câlnic	Military Religious	c.1270–15th century	Includes a fortified chapel.
	Church on the Hill	Sighișoara	Religious	1429–1488	
	Corvin Castle	Hunedoara	Military	1446–19th century	Also known as Hunyadi Castle and as Hunedoara Castle. One of the largest castles in Europe.
	**Dârjiu Fortified Church**	Dârjiu	Military Religious	14th–16th centuries	Fortified church.
	Hărman Fortified Church	Hărman	Military Religious	13th century	Fortified church.
	Mălâncrav Fortified Church	Laslea	Military Religious	14th century	Fortified church.
	Monastery Church	Sighișoara	Religious	1492–1515	
	**Prejmer Fortified Church**	Prejmer	Military Religious	1211–1240	Fortified church.
	Putna Monastery	Putna	Domestic Religious	1466–1662	
	Rugănești Reformed Church	Rugăneşti	Religious	13th–19th centuries	
	St Michael's Church	Cluj-Napoca	Religious	1316–1487	Second-largest church in Transylvania.
	**Saschiz Fortified Church**	Saschiz	Military Religious	1493–1496	Fortified church.
	Sebeș Lutheran Church	Sebeș	Religious	12th–18th centuries	
	Sibiu Lutheran Cathedral	Sibiu	Religious	1371–1520	
	**Valea Viilor Fortified Church**	Valea Viilor	Military Religious	14th–16th centuries	Fortified church.
	Venetian House	Sighișoara	Domestic	16th century	
	**Viscri Fortified Church**	Bunești	Military Religious	13th–16th centuries	Fortified church.

=== Slovakia ===
All of the following existing Gothic buildings are cultural heritage monuments of Slovakia.

Image	Building	Place	Type	Date	Notes
	All Saints' Church	Ludrová	Religious	13th century	
	Basilica of St Benedict	Hronský Beňadik	Religious	14th–15th centuries	
	Basilica of St Giles	Bardejov	Religious		
	Basilica of St James	Levoča	Religious		
	Basilica of the Exaltation of the Holy Cross	Kežmarok	Religious		
	Basilica of the Nativity of the Virgin Mary	Marianka	Religious	1380	
	Beckov Castle	Beckov	Domestic Military Religious		Ruins.
	Bojnice Castle	Bojnice	Domestic Military Religious		
	Bratislava Old Town Hall	Old Town, Bratislava	Civic		
	Budatín Castle	Žilina	Domestic Military Religious		
	Cathedral of St Elizabeth	Košice	Religious		
	Červený Kláštor	Červený Kláštor	Domestic Religious		
	Church of St George	Svätý Jur	Religious	12th–15th centuries	
	Church of St Ladislaus	Spišský Štvrtok	Religious	13th century	Includes the Chapel of the Zápolya Family.
	Clarissine Church	Old Town, Bratislava	Religious	1297–15th century	
	Co-Cathedral of Saint Nicholas	Prešov	Religious	14th century–1515	
	Franciscan Church	Old Town, Bratislava	Religious		
	Holy Trinity Cathedral	Žilina	Religious		
	Kremnica Castle	Kremnica	Civic Military Religious	13th–15th centuries	
	**St Martin's Cathedral**	**Spišská Kapitula**	Religious		
	St Martin's Concathedral	Old Town, Bratislava	Religious		
	St Michael's Chapel	Košice	Religious	14th century	
	St. Nicolas Church	Trnava	Religious		
	**Spiš Castle**	**Žehra**	Domestic Military Religious		
	Zborov Castle	Zborov	Domestic Military Religious		Ruins.
	Zvolen Castle	Zvolen	Domestic Military Religious		

=== Slovenia ===
All of the following existing Gothic buildings are cultural monuments of Slovenia.

Image	Building	Place	Type	Date	Notes
	Annunciation Church	Crngrob	Religious	13th–19th centuries	
	Bled Castle	Bled	Domestic Military Religious	11th–17th centuries	Oldest Slovenian castle. Style ranges from Romanesque to Renaissance. The Gothic portions include some of the walls and the chapel of Sts Ingenuinus and Albuin.
	Church of the Magi	Benedikt	Religious	1521–1588	
	Loggia Palace	Koper	Civic	1462–1698	The only surviving Gothic town hall in Slovenia.
	Maribor Synagogue	Maribor	Religious	13th century	After the Jews were expelled from Maribor in 1497, the building was converted into a church, which purpose it served until 1785, when it was made into a military warehouse. Presently houses a museum.
	Praetorian Palace	Koper	Civic	1452–1664	
	Predjama Castle	Predjama	Military	1274–1580	A surviving and inhabitable cave castle. Although the majority of the castle is in the Renaissance style, several older portions of the original Gothic structure survive and are visible, particularly the entrances to the caves.
	St George's Chapel	Ljubljana	Religious	15th century	Chapel of Ljubljana Castle.
	St George's Church	Ptuj	Religious	12th–15th centuries	
	St John the Baptist's Parish Church	Suha	Religious	c.1450	
	St Rupert's Parish Church	Šentrupert	Religious	12th–15th centuries	Fortified church.
	Snežnik Castle	Loška Dolina	Domestic Military	13th–19th centuries	
	Venetian House	Piran	Domestic	15th century	
	Žiče Charterhouse Church	Slovenske Konjice	Religious	12th–15th centuries	Also known as Seiz Charterhouse Church and as St John the Baptist's Church. Ruins.

=== Switzerland ===
All of the following existing Gothic buildings are either class A properties or world heritage sites.

Image	Building	Place	Type	Date	Notes
	Abbey of St Maurice d'Agaune	Saint-Maurice	Domestic Religious	4th–17th centuries	
	Barfüsserkloster	Altstadt, Zürich	Religious	13th–15th centuries	Mostly demolished. The only surviving remains are the cloisters.
	Basel Minster	Basel	Religious	1019–1500	
	Basel Town Hall	Basel	Civic	1504–1514	
	**Bern Minster**	**Altstadt**, Bern	Religious	1421–1893	Also known as St Vincent's Cathedral.
	**Bern Town Hall**	**Altstadt**, Bern	Civic	1406–1417	
	Birseck Castle	Arlesheim	Domestic Military	1243–18th century	
	Bubikon Commandery	Bubikon	Domestic Military Religious	12th–14th centuries	A commandery of the Knights Hospitaller.
	Calvin Auditory	Geneva	Religious	15th century	Also known as the Calvin Auditorium. Formerly known as Notre-Dame-la-Neuve Chapel. Location where Calvin expounded his theology.
	Chillon Castle	Veytaux	Domestic Military	10th–13th centuries	
	Church of St Leodegar	Luzern	Religious	735–1639	The Gothic building burnt down in 1633; while the majority of the present structure dates to the 17th century and is in Renaissance style, portions of the older church remain, notably the Gothic needle towers.
	City Church of Biel	Biel/Bienne	Religious	1451–1470	
	Collegiate Church of Neuchâtel	Neuchâtel	Religious	1190–1276	
	Commandery of St John	Fribourg	Domestic Military Religious	1259–2012	
	Compesières Commandry	Bardonnex	Domestic Military Religious	13th–16th centuries	
	**Felsenburg**	**Altstadt**, Bern	Domestic Military	1260–1270	
	Fortified Church of St Arbogast	Muttenz	Military Religious	12th century–1630	Fortified church.
	Fraumünster	Altstadt, Zürich	Religious	853–1911	
	Fribourg Cathedral	Fribourg	Religious	1283–c.1430	Also known as the Cathedral of St. Nicholas
	Habsburg Castle	Habsburg	Domestic Military	c.1020–1300	Ancestral seat of the House of Habsburg.
	Haus zum Rüden	Altstadt, Zürich	Civic	c.1373	
	Hofbrücke Kapellbrücke Spreuerbrücke	Luzern	Civic	c.1360	Three medieval covered wooden pedestrian truss bridges, dating to the 14th and 15th centuries and containing a set of 17th-century triangular panel paintings. The Hofbrücke, built 1352–1365, was demolished between 1835–1852 to build the Schweizerhofquai. Its paintings survive in museums. The Kapellbrücke, built c.1365, largely burnt down in 1993 and was rebuilt and resorted in 1994 in the same style. Some portions of the original bridge remain. The Spreuerbrücke was initially built in the 13th century and completed in 1408, largely destroyed by a storm in 1566, and subsequently rebuilt (in the same style). Its accompanying mills burnt down in the 19th century.
	**Holländerturm**	**Altstadt**, Bern	Military	13th century	
	Holligen Castle	Bern	Domestic Military	c.1500	
	Königsfelden Monastery	Windisch	Domestic Religious	14th century	
	Kyburg Castle	Kyburg	Domestic Military Religious	c.1030–c.1530	One of the locations where the Imperial Regalia were kept prior to 1791.
	Lausanne Cathedral	Lausanne	Religious	1170–1235	Also known as the Cathédrale Notre-Dame de Lausanne or as the Cathedral of Notre Dame of Lausanne.
	Lugano Cathedral	Lugano	Religious	15th century	Also known as the Cathedral of St Lawrence and as Cattedrale di San Lorenzo.
	**Nydeggkirche**	**Altstadt**, Bern	Religious	1341–1346	
	Oetenbach Nunnery	Altstadt, Zürich	Domestic Religious	c.1285–1317	Demolished 1902–1903.
	Predigerkirche Zürich	Altstadt, Zürich	Religious	1231–1350	The only standing remains of Predigerkloster.
	St Oswald's Church	Zug	Religious	1477–1719	
	St Peter's Church	Altstadt, Zürich	Religious	1230–1706	Only the tower remains Gothic. The tower's clock has the largest face in Europe.
	St Pierre Cathedral	Geneva	Religious	12th century	
	Wasserkirche	Altstadt, Zürich	Religious	c.1480	
	Wettingen Abbey	Wettingen	Domestic Religious	13th–17th centuries	Includes Gasthof Sternen.
	Wittigkofen Castle	Bern	Domestic Military	13th century	
	Zug Castle	Zug	Domestic Military	13th century	

== Eastern Europe ==
=== Belarus ===
All of the following existing Gothic buildings are ranked architectural heritage of Belarus.

Image	Building	Place	Type	Date	Notes
	Cathedral of Sts Boris and Gleb	Novogrudok	Religious	1519– c.1635	Fortified church.
	Church of St John the Baptist	Kamai	Military Religious	1603–1606	Fortified church.
	Church of St Michael	Synkavichy	Military Religious	Before 1320–16th century	Fortified church.
	Church of St Michael Archangel	Hniezna, Vawkavysk District	Religious	1524	
	Church of the Holy Trinity	Iškaldź, Brest Voblasts	Religious	15th century	
	**Mir Castle Complex**	Mir	Military	16th century	
	**Muravanka Church**	Muravanka	Military Religious	1524–1542	Also known as the Church of the Nativity of the Theotokos. Fortified church.
	Navahrudak Castle	Novogrudok	Military	14th century	Ruins.
	Transfiguration Church	Novogrudok	Religious	14th century–1723	Most of the 14th-century Gothic church was torn down to erect the present building. with the exception of two chapels which are integrated into the present structure. Site where a group of nuns were martyred by a Gestapo.

=== Latvia ===
All of the following existing Gothic buildings are national architectural monuments of Latvia.

Image	Building	Place	Type	Date	Notes
	Aizkraukle Castle	Aizkraukle	Military		Ruins.
	Aizkraukle Lutheran Church	Aizkraukle	Religious		
	Aizpute Castle	Aizpute	Military		Ruins.
	Alūksne Castle	Alūksne	Military		Ruins.
	Bauska Castle	Bauska	Military		Partial ruin.
	Cēsis Castle	Cēsis	Military		Ruins.
	Church of St John the Baptist	Cēsis	Religious		
	Church of the Holy Spirit	Bauska	Religious		
	Dinaburga Castle	Naujene	Domestic Military Religious		Destroyed in 1577.
	Dobele Castle	Dobele	Military		Ruins.
	Ēdole Castle	Ēdole	Domestic Military Religious	1264–1907	Former episcopal palace with additions from the 18th and 19th centuries.
	Gaujiena Castle	Gaujiena	Military		Ruins.
	House of the Blackheads	**Vecrīga**, Riga	Civic		
	Jaunpils Castle	Jaunpils	Military		
	Koknese Castle	Koknese	Military		Ruins.
	Krimulda Castle	Sigulda	Military		Ruins.
	Krustpils Castle	Jēkabpils	Military		
	Ludza Castle	Ludza	Military		Ruins.
	**Museum of the History of Riga and Navigation**	**Vecrīga**, Riga	–		Originally built as the Riga cathedral school.
	Piltene Castle	Piltene	Military		Ruins.
	**Powder Tower**	**Vecrīga**, Riga	Military		
	Rauna Castle	Rauna	Military		Ruins.
	**Riga Castle**	**Vecrīga**, Riga	Military		
	**Riga Cathedral**	**Vecrīga**, Riga	Religious		Also known as the Cathedral Church of St Mary and as the Dome Cathedral.
	**St James' Cathedral**	**Vecrīga**, Riga	Religious		
	**St John's Church**	**Vecrīga**, Riga	Religious		
	**St Peter's Church**	**Vecrīga**, Riga	Religious		
	**St Mary Magdalene's Church**	**Vecrīga**, Riga	Religious		
	Sigulda Medieval Castle	Sigulda	Military		
	**Three Brothers**	**Vecrīga**, Riga	Domestic		
	Turaida Castle	Turaida	Military		

=== Lithuania ===
All of the following existing Gothic buildings are Nekilnojamųjų kultūros vertybių.

Image	Building	Place	Type	Date	Notes
	**Cathedral of the Theotokos**	**Old Town**, Vilnius	Military Religious		Fortified church.
	**Church of St Anne**	**Old Town**, Vilnius	Religious	1495–1500	
	**Church of Sts Francis and Bernard**	**Old Town**, Vilnius	Religious		
	Church of St George the Martyr	Centras, Kaunas	Religious		
	Church of St Gertrude	Centras, Kaunas	Religious		
	Church of Saint Nicholas	Centras, Kaunas	Religious		
	**Church of Saint Nicholas**	**Old Town**, Vilnius	Religious		
	Church of the Assumption of the Blessed Virgin Mary	**Old Town**, Vilnius	Religious		
	Church of Vytautas the Great	Centras, Kaunas	Religious		Also known as the Church of the Assumption of the Blessed Virgin Mary.
	House of Perkūnas	Centras, Kaunas			
	Kaunas Castle	Centras, Kaunas	Military		
	Kaunas Cathedral Basilica	Centras, Kaunas	Religious		Also known as the Cathedral Basilica of Apostles St Peter and St Paul.
	Kretinga Bernardine Monastery	Kretinga	Domestic Religious	1605–1617	Also known as the Bernardine Monastery and Church of the Annunciation to the Blessed Virgin Mary.
	Medininkai Castle	Medininkai	Military		
	Old Church of St John the Baptist	Zapyškis	Religious		
	Palace of the Grand Dukes of Lithuania (Mediaeval)	**Old Town**, Vilnius			
	St George's Church	Kėdainiai	Religious		
	Trakai Island Castle	Trakai	Military		
	Trakai Peninsula Castle	Trakai	Military		
	Vilnius Cathedral	**Old Town**, Vilnius	Religious	c.1251–19th century	Also known as the Archcathedral Basilica of St Stanislaus and St Ladislas. Destroyed and rebuilt several times; the present structure began after a fire in 1610. The Gothic incarnations of the cathedral were built under Mindaugas, Władysław II Jagiełło, and Vytautas. The present structure includes portions from the Gothic iterations: the foundations (Mindaugas), the crypt (Jagiełło), and some walls and pillars (Vytautas).
	Vilnius Upper Castle	**Old Town**, Vilnius			Also known as Gediminas Castle. Ruins. It is considered part of Vilnius Castle Complex and includes Gediminas' Tower.

=== Poland ===
All of the following existing Gothic buildings are zabytek.

Image	Building	Place	Type	Date	Notes
	Basilica of Sts James and Agnes	Nysa	Religious		Designated a Historic Monument of Poland.
	**Basilica of the Holy Trinity**	**Old Town**, Kraków	Religious		Part of the Old Town, also designated a Historic Monument of Poland.
	Chojna Town Hall	Chojna	Civic		
	Church of St Adalbert	Old Town, Wrocław	Religious		Part of the Old Town, designated a Historic Monument of Poland.
	**Church of St James the Greater**	**Toruń**	Religious		Part of the historic city centre, also designated a Historic Monument of Poland.
	Church of St John the Baptist	Międzyrzecz	Religious		
	Church of St Mary	Chojna	Religious		
	Church of St Mary on the Sand	Old Town, Wrocław	Religious		Part of the Old Town, designated a Historic Monument of Poland.
	Saints James and Nicholas church	Chełmno	Religious		Part of the Old Town, designated a Historic Monument of Poland.
	Saints Peter and Paul church	Chełmno	Religious		Part of the Old Town, designated a Historic Monument of Poland.
	Church of the Assumption of the Blessed Virgin Mary	Chełmno	Religious		Part of the Old Town, designated a Historic Monument of Poland.
	Collegiate Basilica of the Birth of the Blessed Virgin Mary	Wiślica	Religious		Designated a Historic Monument of Poland.
	Collegiate Church of Sts Peter and Paul	Lidzbark Warmiński	Religious		
	Collegiate Church of the Assumption of the Blessed Virgin Mary	Głogów	Religious		
	Collegiate Church of the Holy Cross and St Bartholomew	Old Town, Wrocław	Religious		Part of the Old Town, designated a Historic Monument of Poland.
	**Collegium Maius**	**Old Town**, Kraków	–		Part of the Old Town, also designated a Historic Monument of Poland.
	**Copernicus House**	**Toruń**	Domestic		Part of the historic city centre, also designated a Historic Monument of Poland.
	Corpus Christi Basilica	Kazimierz, Kraków	Religious		
	Corpus Christi Collegiate Church	Biecz	Religious		
	Frombork Cathedral	Frombork	Religious		Also known as the Archcathedral Basilica of the Assumption of the Blessed Virgin Mary and St Andrew. Designated a Historic Monument of Poland.
	Gdańsk Town Hall	Główne Miasto, Gdańsk	Civic		Part of the historic city centre, designated a Historic Monument of Poland.
	Gniew Castle	Gniew			
	Gniezno Cathedral	Gniezno	Religious		Also known as the Primatial Cathedral Basilica of the Assumption of the Blessed Virgin Mary and Shrine of St Adalbert. Designated a Historic Monument of Poland.
	Gothic Bridge over the Młynówka	Kłodzko	Civic		
	Kołbacz Abbey	Kołbacz	Religious		Designated a Historic Monument of Poland.
	**Kraków Barbican**	**Old Town**, Kraków	Military		Part of the Old Town, also designated a Historic Monument of Poland.
	**Kraków Town Hall**	**Old Town**, Kraków	Civic		Part of the Old Town, also designated a Historic Monument of Poland.
	Kwidzyn Castle	Kwidzyn			Designated a Historic Monument of Poland.
	Lidzbark Castle	Lidzbark Warmiński			Also known as Lidzbark Bishops' Castle. Designated a Historic Monument of Poland.
	**Malbork Castle**	Malbork			Also designated a Historic Monument of Poland.
	**Old Synagogue**	Kazimierz, Kraków	Religious		Fortified synagogue.
	Oliwa Cathedral	Oliwa, Gdańsk	Religious		Also known as the Archcathedral Basilica of the Holy Trinity in Oliwa, Gdańsk. Designated a Historic Monument of Poland.
	Olsztyn Castle	Olsztyn		1346–1353	Designated a Historic Monument of Poland.
	Co-Cathedral Basilica of St. James	Olsztyn	Religious	14th century	
	Pelplin Abbey	Pelplin	Domestic Religious		Also known as the Cathedral Basilica of the Assumption. Designated a Historic Monument of Poland.
	Poznań Cathedral	Poznań	Religious		Also known as the Archcathedral Basilica of St Peter and St Paul. Part of the Old Town, designated a Historic Monument of Poland.
	Bernardine Monastery Complex	Radom	Religious		Designated a Historic Monument of Poland.
	Długosz House	Sandomierz	Civic		Part of the Old Town, designated a Historic Monument of Poland.
	Protzen House	Stargard			
	St Catherine's Church	Old Town, Gdańsk	Religious		Part of the historic city centre, designated a Historic Monument of Poland.
	St Dorothea Church	Old Town, Wrocław	Religious		Part of the Old Town, designated a Historic Monument of Poland.
	St Elizabeth's Church	Old Town, Wrocław	Religious		Part of the Old Town, designated a Historic Monument of Poland.
	**St Florian's Gate**	**Old Town**, Kraków			Part of the Old Town, also designated a Historic Monument of Poland.
	St Jadwiga's Church	Brzeg	Religious		Designated a Historic Monument of Poland.
	**St John's Archcathedral**	**Old Town**, Warsaw	Religious		Part of the Old Town, also designated a Historic Monument of Poland.
	St John the Evangelist's Church	Paczków	Religious		Part of the Old Town, designated a Historic Monument of Poland.
	St Martin's Church	Old Town, Wrocław	Religious		Part of the Old Town, designated a Historic Monument of Poland.
	**St Mary's Basilica**	**Old Town**, Kraków	Religious		With a famous Veit Stoß altar carved in wood. Part of the Old Town, also designated a Historic Monument of Poland.
	St Mary's Church	Główne Miasto, Gdańsk	Religious	1343–1502	Also known as the Basilica of the Assumption of the Virgin Mary. The largest brick church in the world. Part of the historic city centre, designated a Historic Monument of Poland.
	St Mary's Church	Stargard	Religious		Designated a Historic Monument of Poland.
	St Nicholas' Church	Gniew	Religious		
	Sts Peter and Paul Basilica	Strzegom	Religious		Designated a Historic Monument of Poland.
	Świdnica Cathedral	Świdnica	Religious		Also known as St. Stanislaus and St. Wenceslaus Cathedral. Designated a Historic Monument of Poland.
	**Toruń Castle**	**Toruń**			Ruins. Part of the historic city centre, also designated a Historic Monument of Poland.
	**Toruń Cathedral**	**Toruń**	Religious		Part of the historic city centre, also designated a Historic Monument of Poland.
	**Toruń Old Town City Hall**	**Toruń**	Civic		Part of the historic city centre, also designated a Historic Monument of Poland.
	**Wawel Castle**	**Old Town**, Kraków			Part of the Old Town, also designated a Historic Monument of Poland.
	**Wawel Cathedral**	**Old Town**, Kraków	Religious		Also known as the Royal Archcathedral Basilica of Saints Stanislaus and Wenceslaus. Part of the Old Town, also designated a Historic Monument of Poland.
	Wrocław Cathedral	Old Town, Wrocław	Religious		Also known as the Cathedral of St John the Baptist. Part of the Old Town, designated a Historic Monument of Poland.
	Wrocław Town Hall	Old Town, Wrocław	Civic		Part of the Old Town, designated a Historic Monument of Poland.
	**Żupny Castle**	Wieliczka			Also designated a Historic Monument of Poland.

=== Russia ===
Due to the recent arrival of the Russian language to the region known today as Kaliningrad and the consequently far greater degree of relevance of German to that region's history and architecture, especially regarding the Middle Ages, when possible the German names have been used for structures and places therein.

Image	Building	Place	Type	Date	Notes
	Altstadt Church	Altstadt, Königsberg	Religious	1264–1537	Also known as the Old Church of St Nicholas in Königsberg. Dismantled in the 1820s and replaced with the New Altstadt Church.
	Balga Castle	Bagrationovsky District	Civic Domestic Military	1239–1250	Also known as Honeda Castle. Teutonic Ordensburg. Ruins. Suffered further damage in World War II. Oldest Ordensburg in the region built by the Teutonic Knights.
	Brandenburg Castle	Brandenburg	Domestic Military	c.1366	Ruins.
	Brandenburg Church	Brandenburg	Religious	14th century	Fell into ruins during World War II.
	**Chamber of Facets**	Novgorod	–	1433	The only known Gothic structure in Russia proper.
	Fischhausen Church	Fischhausen	Religious	c.1400–1500	Demolished 1961.
	Georgensburg Castle	Georgenburg	Domestic Military Religious	c.1385–1390	Teutonic Ordensburg. Ruins.
	Gerdauen Castle	Gerdauen	Domestic Military	c.1312	Teutonic Ordensburg. Ruins.
	Gerdauen Church	Gerdauen	Military Religious	1260–15th century	Fortified church. Ruins.
	Groß Wohnsdorf Castle	Groß Wohnsdorf	Military	13th–14th centuries	Teutonic Ordensburg. Ruins.
	Insterburg Castle	Insterburg	Domestic Military	1336	Teutonic Ordensburg. Ruins. Partially burnt down in 1945; partially demolished in the 1950s.
	Juditten Church	Juditten, Königsberg	Military Religious	c.1287	Fortified church built by the Teutonic Knights. Oldest existing building in Königsberg.
	Königsberg Castle	Freiheit, Königsberg	Civic Domestic Military Religious	1255–18th century	Teutonic Ordensburg. Destroyed by the Soviet government in 1969. The surviving underground structures are presently intended to become a museum. Included a castle church.
	Königsberg Cathedral	Kneiphof, Königsberg	Religious	c.1330–1380	
	Labiau Castle	Labiau	Domestic Military	1360	Teutonic Ordensburg. Burnt down in 1965.
	Lochstedt Castle	Fischhausen	Domestic Military Religious	1275–1285	Teutonic Ordensburg. Largely destroyed in World War II; remains demolished in the 1960s. Included a castle chapel. Many of the rooms contained fine frescoes.
	Neuhausen Castle	Neuhausen	Domestic Military	1292	Teutonic Ordensburg. Ruins.
	Neuhausen Church	Neuhausen	Religious	14th century–c.1500	
	Pobethen Church	Pobethen	Religious	14th–15th centuries	Ruins.
	Preußisch Eylau Castle	Preußisch Eylau	Domestic Military Religious	1325–1330	Teutonic Ordensburg. The main castle buildings burnt down in 1455, however, the outbuildings remain intact.
	Ragnit Castle	Ragnit	Domestic Military	1397–1409	Teutonic Ordensburg. Ruins.
	Schaaken Castle	Liska-Schaaken	Domestic Military	13th–14th centuries	Teutonic Ordensburg. Ruins.
	Schaaken Church	Liska-Schaaken	Religious	14th century	Ruins.
	Steindamm Church	Altstadt, Königsberg	Religious	1263	Also known as St Nicholas' Church, as the Polish Church, and as the Old Lithuanian Church. Destroyed 1945–1950. Oldest church in Königsberg.
	Tapiau Castle	Tapiau	Domestic Military Religious	1351	Teutonic Ordensburg. Ruins.
	Taplacken Castle	Taplacken	Domestic Military	c.1400	Teutonic Ordensburg. Ruins.
	Tilsit Castle	Tilsit	Domestic Military	c.1410	Teutonic Ordensburg. Ruins.
	Waldau Castle	Waldau	Domestic Military	c.1264	Teutonic Ordensburg.

=== Ukraine ===
Image	Building	Place	Type	Date	Notes
	Błażowski Chapel	Yazlovets	Religious		
	Cathedral Basilica of the Assumption	Old Town, Lviv	Religious	1360–1481	Also known as the Metropolitan Basilica Cathedral of the Assumption of the Blessed Virgin Mary and as the Latin Cathedral of Lviv.
	Church of Jesus' Heart	Bene, Zakarpattia	Religious		
	Church of the Epiphany of the Lord	Ostroh	Religious		
	Dominican Monastery	Starokostiantyniv	Domestic Religious		
	Church of the Exaltation of the Holy Cross	Berehove	Religious		
	Franciscan Church of the Holy Cross	Lviv	Religious		
	Halych Castle	Halych			
	Husiatyn Synagogue	Husiatyn	Military Religious		Fortified synagogue. Ruins.
	Lubart's Castle	Lutsk			
	Olesko Castle	Olesko			
	Ostroh Castle	Ostroh			
	Pidhaitsi Synagogue	Pidhaitsi	Military Religious	17th century	Fortified synagogue. Ruins.
	St Bartholomew's Church	Drohobych	Religious		
	St Elisabeth's Church	Khust	Religious		
	St Martin's Church	Skelivka	Religious		
	Sataniv Synagogue	Sataniv	Military Religious		Fortified synagogue.
	Yazlovets Castle	Yazlovets			Ruins.
	Zymne Monastery	Zymne	Domestic Religious		

== France ==
=== France ===
All of the following existing Gothic buildings are monuments historiques classés.

Image	Building	Place	Type	Date	Notes
	Abbey of St Benignus of Dijon	Dijon	Domestic Religious	1280–1325	Includes Dijon Cathedral.
	Abbey of Saint-Denis	Saint-Denis	Domestic Religious	745–1144	Includes the Basilica of Saint-Denis, which is considered by many to be the first fully Gothic building.
	Abbey of Saint-Étienne	Caen	Domestic Religious	1066–13th century	Also known as the Abbaye aux Hommes and as the Abbey of St Stephen.
	Abbey of St Genevieve	Place du Panthéon, 5th arrondissement, Paris	Domestic Religious	502–13th century	Apart from the bell tower, the Tour Clovis, it was torn down in 1744 and replaced with the Panthéon. A centre for copying and scholarship, its library ultimately became Sainte-Geneviève Library. Peter Abelard taught at the abbey school from 1108 to 1113.
	Abbey of Saint-Germain-des-Prés	Saint-Germain-des-Prés	Domestic Religious	558–1792	
	Abbey of Saint-Pierre-sur-Dives	Saint-Pierre-sur-Dives	Domestic Religious	1067–17th century	
	Abbey of Saint-Remi	Reims	Domestic Religious	6th–18th centuries	Presently divided into a church, the Basilica of Saint-Remi, and a museum. The abbey church itself was built in the 11th–15th centuries.
	Aix Cathedral	Aix-en-Provence	Religious	12th–16th centuries	Also known as the Cathedral of the Holy Saviour.
	**Albi Catheral**	Albi	Religious	1282–1480	Also known as the Cathedral Basilica of St Cecilia.
	**Amiens Cathedral**	Amiens	Religious	c.1220–1270	Also known as Notre-Dame d'Amiens and as the Cathedral Basilica of Our Lady of Amiens. Has the second highest nave of cathedrals in France.
	Angers Cathedral	Angers	Religious	1032–1523	Also known as the Cathedral of Saint Maurice.
	**Arras Town Hall**	Arras	Civic	1501–1517	
	Augustinian Convent of Toulouse	Toulouse	Domestic Religious	c.1310–1504	Today, its buildings house the Musée des Augustins de Toulouse.
	Autun Cathedral	Autun	Religious	1120–1146	Also known as the Cathedral of Saint Lazarus of Autun. The decoration of the Romanesque portions of the building are by Gislebertus.
	Auxerre Cathedral	Auxerre	Religious	1215–16th century	Also known as the Cathedral of Saint Stephen.
	**Basilica of St Michael**	Bordeaux	Religious	14th–16th centuries	
	Basilica of Saint Nicholas	Saint-Nicolas-de-Port	Religious	15th–16th centuries	
	Basilica of St Quentin	Saint-Quentin	Religious	12th–16th centuries	Also known as the Collegiate Church of Saint-Quentin and as the Basilica of Saint-Quentin.
	Basilica of St Urban	Troyes	Religious	1262–1905	Also known as the Église Saint-Urbain and as the Basilique Saint-Urbain de Troyes.
	Bastille Saint-Antoine	Paris	Military	14th century	Also known as the Bastille. It was demolished from 1789 to 1790; the present site is the Place de la Bastille. For most of its history it was used as a prison by the kings of France, ultimately leading to the Storming of the Bastille, the anniversary of which is the French national holiday.
	Bayeux Cathedral	Bayeux	Religious	Before 1066–19th century	Also known as Notre-Dame de Bayeux and as the Cathedral of Our Lady of Bayeux. Location where Harold Godwinson swore felty to William the Bastard in 1066. Housed the Bayeux Tapestry from the 11th century until it was confiscated by revolutionaries in 1792.
	Beauvais Cathedral	Beauvais	Religious	1225–1600	Also known as the Cathedral of St Peter. Never completed; the present structure consists of a Gothic apse, choir, and transept. Has the tallest nave in the world, as well as the tallest Gothic choir.
	**Belfry of Douai**	Douai	Civic	1380–1475	
	**Blois Cathedral**	**Blois**	Religious	1544–1700	Also known as the Cathedral of St Louis.
	**Bordeaux Cathedral**	Bordeaux	Religious	12th–16th centuries	Also known as the Primatial Cathedral of St Andrew.
	**Bourges Cathedral**	Bourges	Religious	1195– c.1230	Also known as the Cathedral of St Stephen.
	Cahors Cathedral	Cahors	Religious	1080–1135	Also known as the Cathedral of Saint Stephen.
	Carpentras Cathedral	Carpentras	Religious	1409–1531	Also known as the Cathedral of St Siffredus of Carpentras.
	Châlon Cathedral	Châlon-sur-Saône	Religious	9th–16th centuries	Also known as the Cathedral of St Vincent. The present façade is 19th century.
	Châlons Cathedral	Châlons-en-Champagne	Religious	12th–17th centuries	Also known as the Cathedral of Saint Stephen.
	Chambéry Cathedral	Chambéry	Religious	1420–1585	Also known as the Cathedral of St Francis de Sales. Contains the largest ensemble of trompe-l'œil in Europe.
	Champmol	Dijon	Religious	1383–1433	Also known as Chartreuse de Champmol.
	**Chartres Cathedral**	Chartres	Religious	1126–1252	Also known as Notre-Dame de Chartres and as the Cathedral of Our Lady of Chartres. Retains its original 12th-century stained-glass windows.
	Château d'Angers	Angers	Domestic Military Religious	9th–13th centuries	Houses the Apocalypse Tapestry.
	**Château de Blois**	**Blois**	Domestic Military Religious	13th–17th centuries	
	Château de Châteaudun	Châteaudun	Domestic Military Religious	12th–16th centuries	
	Château de Chaumont-sur-Loire	Chaumont-sur-Loire	Domestic Military Religious	15th century	Also known as Château de Chaumont.
	Château de Dourdan	Dourdan	Domestic Military Religious	1220s	
	Château de Goulaine	Haute-Goulaine	Domestic Military	12th–17th centuries	
	Château de la Tournelle	5th arrondissement, Paris	Military	14th century	Destroyed.
	Château de Maintenon	Maintenon	Domestic Military	13th–18th centuries	
	Château de Meillant	Meillant	Domestic Military	15th century	
	**Château de Montsoreau**	**Montsoreau**	Domestic Military	1443–1515	
	**Château de Saumur**	**Saumur**	Domestic Military	10th–16th centuries	
	Château de Vincennes	Vincennes	Domestic Military Religious	1361–1369	Former fortress and royal residence. Includes the Sainte-Chapelle de Vincennes.
	**Church of St Jacques**	Compiègne	Religious	1235–16th century	
	Church of Saint-Maclou	Rouen	Religious	1436–1521	
	**Cité de Carcassonne**	Carcassonne	–	Construction ended in the early 14th century	Includes the **Basilica of Saints Nazarius and Celsus** and **Carcassonne Cathedral** along with a château fort, houses, and fortifications.
	Clermont-Ferrand Cathedral	Clermont-Ferrand	Religious	1248–1902	Also known as the Cathedral of the Assumption of Our Lady.
	Collège des Bernardins	5th arrondissement, Paris	–	13th century	Also known as the Collège Saint-Bernard. Home of the Cathedral School of Paris, which ultimately gave rise to the University of Paris.
	Collegiate Church of St Felix	Saint-Félix-Lauragais	Religious	14th century	Also known as the Church of St Felix.
	Commandery of St John	Angers		1175	
	Compiègne Town Hall	Compiègne	Civic	1490–1530	
	Convent of the Cordeliers	Toulouse	Religious	13th century	Destroyed from 1790–1818; a fire destroyed most of the remaining structures in 1871.
	Convent of the Jacobins	Toulouse	Religious	1230–1341	
	Coutances Cathedral	Coutances	Religious	1180–1270	Also known as Notre-Dame de Coutances.
	Dol Cathedral	Dol-de-Bretagne	Religious	1203–16th century	Also known as the Cathedral of St Samson of Dol and as Dol-en-Bretagne Cathedral.
	Évreux Cathedral	Évreux	Religious	11th–19th centuries	Also known as Notre-Dame de Évreux and as the Cathedral of Our Lady of Évreux.
	Fécamp Abbey	Fécamp	Domestic Religious	1187–1228	Also known as the Abbey of the Holy Trinity at Fécamp. First producer of bénédictine.
	Hôtel de Bourgogne	2nd arrondissement, Paris	Domestic	1409–1411	Also known as the Hôtel d'Artois. The Tour Jean-sans-Peur is the only surviving portion.
	Hôtel de Cluny	Latin Quarter, 5th arrondissement, Paris	Domestic	15th century	Presently houses the Musée de Cluny.
	Hôtel de Sens	Sens	Domestic	15th century	Also known as Hôtel des archevêques de Sens. Presently houses the Forney Art Library.
	Hôtel-Dieu de Beaune	Beaune	Domestic	1443–1457	Also known as the Hospices of Beaune and as the Hospices de Beaune.
	Langres Cathedral	Langres	Religious	1150–1196	Also known as the Cathedral of St Mammes. Romanesque and Romano-Gothic with later additions.
	Laon Cathedral	Laon	Religious	1150–1230	Also known as Notre-Dame de Laon and as the Cathedral of Our Lady of Laon.
	Lavaur Cathedral	Lavaur	Religious	c.1255–1730	Also known as the Cathedral of St Alan of Lavaur.
	Le Mans Cathedral	Le Mans	Religious	6th—14th centuries	Also known as the Cathedral of Saint Julian of Le Mans.
	**Le Puy Cathedral**	Le Puy-en-Velay	Religious	11th–13th centuries	Also known as the Cathedral of the Assumption of Our Lady. Mainly Romanesque with Gothic additions and modifications, especially the side chapels.
	Lectoure Cathedral	Lectoure	Religious	12th–18th centuries	Also known as the Cathedral of Saint Gervasius and Saint Protasius of Lectoure.
	Limoges Cathedral	Limoges	Religious	1273–1888	Also known as the Cathedral of Saint Stephen.
	Lisieux Cathedral	Lisieux	Religious	12th–18th centuries	Also known as the Cathedral of Saint Peter.
	Lodève Cathedral	Lodève	Religious	13th–20th centuries	Also known as the Cathedral of Saint Fulcran.
	Lombez Cathedral	Lombez	Religious	14th–15th centuries	Also known as the Cathedral of Saint Mary.
	Louvre Castle	Paris	Domestic Military	1190–1202	Demolished 1528–1660 to make room for the modern Louvre Palace; some portions survive and are on display at the Louvre as the Louvre médiéval.
	Lyon Cathedral	Lyon	Religious	1180–1480	Also known as the Primatial Cathedral of St John the Baptist.
	Maison d'Adam	Angers	Domestic	c.1491	Also known as the Maison d'Adam et Éve and as the Maison de l'Arbre-de-Vie.
	Meaux Cathedral	Meaux	Religious	1175–1540	Also known as the Cathedral of St Stephen.
	Metz Cathedral	Metz	Religious	1220–1550	Also known as the Cathedral of St Stephen. Has the third highest nave of cathedrals in France.
	Mirepoix Cathedral	Mirepoix	Religious	1298–19th century	Also known as the Cathedral of Saint Maurice. Has the second widest Gothic arch in Europe.
	**Mont-Saint-Michel Abbey**	**Mont-Saint-Michel**	Domestic Religious	9th century–1532	Also known as the Abbey of Mont Saint-Michel.
	Moulins Cathedral	Moulins	Religious	15th–19th centuries	Also known as Notre-Dame de Moulins and as the Cathedral-Basilica of the Assumption of Our Lady of Moulins.
	Musée départemental de l'Oise	Beauvais	Domestic	1149–1521	Formerly the Palace of the Bishop of Beauvais.
	Nantes Cathedral	Nantes	Religious	1434–1891	Also known as the Cathedral of St Peter and St Paul.
	Narbonne Cathedral	Narbonne	Religious	1272–c.1354	Also known as the Cathedral of Saints Justus and Pastor. Unfinished.
	Nevers Cathedral	Nevers	Religious	10th–16th centuries	Also known as the Cathedral of Saint Cyricus and Saint Julitta of Nevers.
	Niederhaslach Church	Niederhaslach	Religious	1274–1385	Also known as Parish Church of Saint John the Baptist. Formerly known as the Collegiate Church of Saint Florentius.
	Basilique Notre-Dame de Cléry	Cléry-Saint-André	Religious	1449–1485	Also known as the Basilica of Our Lady of Cléry.
	Notre-Dame de l'Épine	L'Épine	Religious	1405–1527	Also known as the Basilica of Our Lady of l'Épine.
	**Notre-Dame de Paris**	4th arrondissement, Paris	Religious	1163–1345	Also known as Notre-Dame, as the Cathedral of Notre-Dame de Paris, and as the Cathedral of Our Lady of Paris. Presently undergoing restoration after the 2019 fire.
	Notre-Dame de Simorre	Simorre	Religious	14th–19th centuries	Also known as the Church of Our Lady of the Assumption of Simorre and as the Church of Our Lady of Simorre.
	Noyon Cathedral	Noyon	Religious	1145–1235	Also known as Notre-Dame de Noyon and as the Cathedral of Our Lady of Noyon.
	**Orléans Cathedral**	**Orléans**	Religious	1278–1329	Also known as the Cathedral of the Holy Cross. Was partially destroyed by the Huguenots in 1568, and was repaired from 1601 to 1829. Was frequented by Jeanne d'Arc during the Siege of Orléans.
	Palace of Poitiers	Poitiers	Civic Military	1018–1416	
	Palais de la Cité	Île de la Cité	Civic Domestic Religious	13th century	Also known as the Palais de Justice. The majority of the medieval royal residence was destroyed by fires, leaving only Sainte-Chapelle (known for its 13th-century stained glass) and the Conciergerie (which was used as a prison during the Reign of Terror).
	Palace of the Duchy of Auvergne	Riom	Religious	1395–1403	The only surviving portion is Sainte-Chapelle de Riom.
	**Palais des Papes**	Avignon	Domestic Religious	13th–14th centuries	Papal palace during the Avignon Papacy.
	Palais Jacques Cœur	Bourges	Domestic	1443–1453	
	Pamiers Cathedral	Pamiers	Religious	12th–17th centuries	Also known as the Cathedral of St Antoninus of Pamiers.
	Parlement de Normandie	Rouen	Civic	1499–1508	Also known as the Parliament of Rouen.
	Poitiers Cathedral	Poitiers	Religious	12th–14th centuries	Also known as the Cathedral of Saint Peter of Poitiers.
	Pont Valentré	Cahors	Civic	1308–1378	
	Pontigny Abbey	Pontigny	Domestic Religious	12th–13th centuries	Surviving buildings includes the Abbey Church of Our Lady and St Edmund of Pontigny (or the Cathédrale Notre-Dame-et-Saint-Edme de Pontigny). Is the seat of the Territorial Prelature of the Mission de France at Pontigny.
	Pontoise Cathedral	Pontoise	Religious	c.1145–c.1590	Also known as the Cathedral of St Maclou.
	Quimper Cathedral	Quimper	Religious	13th–15th centuries	Also known as the Cathedral of Saint Corentin of Quimper and as Saint Corentin Cathedral.
	**Reims Cathedral**	Reims	Religious	1211–1345	Also known as Notre-Dame de Reims and as the Primatial Cathedral of the Assumption of Our Lady of Reims. Location where the kings of France were crowned (beginning with the baptism of Clovis); the cathedral dates back to the 5th century and has had three previous buildings before the current one.
	Rieux Cathedral	Rieux-Volvestre	Religious	14th century	Also known as the Cathedral of the Nativity of Mary of Rieux and as the Cathedral of St Mary. Fortified church.
	Rodez Cathedral	Rodez	Religious	1277–1542	Also known as Notre-Dame de Rodez and as the Cathedral of Our Lady of Rodez.
	Rouen Cathedral	Rouen	Religious	1030–1880	Also known as the Primatial Cathedral of Notre-Dame de Rouen, as the Cathedral of the Assumption of Our Lady of Rouen, and as Notre-Dame de Rouen.
	Royal Castle of Senlis and the Priory of St Maurice	Senlis	Civic Domestic Religious	5th–18th centuries	Largely in ruins. The majority of the existing buildings date to the 12th century, primarily the reign of Louis VII.
	Saint-Brieuc Cathedral	Saint-Brieuc	Religious	12th–20th centuries	Also known as the Basilica Cathedral of Saint Stephen.
	Saint-Étienne-du-Mont	Montagne Sainte-Geneviève	Religious	1494–1624	Also known as the Church of Saint Stephen of the Mount.
	Saint-Eustache	1st arrondissement, Paris	Religious	1532–1632	Also known as the Church of St Eustace.
	Saint-Flour Cathedral	Saint-Flour	Religious	1398–1466	Also known as the Cathedral of Saint Peter and Saint Florus.
	St George's Church	Sélestat	Religious	1230–1490	
	Saint-Germer-de-Fly Abbey	Saint-Germer-de-Fly	Domestic Religious	7th century–1808	Also known as the Abbey of St Germer in Saint-Germer-de-Fly.
	St Martin's Church	Colmar	Religious	1235–1365	
	St. Martin's Church	Langrune-sur-Mer	Religious	12th century–1298	
	St. Nicolas Church	Toulouse	Religious	12th–14th centuries	
	Saint-Omer Cathedral	Saint-Omer	Religious	13th–16th centuries	Also known as Notre-Dame de Saint-Omer and as the Cathedral of Our Lady of Saint-Omer.
	Saint-Ouen Abbey	Rouen	Domestic Religious	1318–1537	
	St Peter's Church	Caen	Religious	13th–16th centuries	
	St Peter and St Paul's Church	Wissembourg	Religious	11th–14th centuries	
	Saint-Pol-de-Léon Cathedral	Saint-Pol-de-Léon	Religious	12th–16th centuries	Also known as the Cathedral of St Paul Aurelian.
	Saint-Quentin Town Hall	Saint-Quentin, Aisne	Civic	1331–1509	
	St Theobald's Church	Thann	Religious	1332–1516	
	Sées Cathedral	Sées	Religious	13th–14th centuries	Also known as Notre-Dame de Sées and as the Basilica Cathedral of Our Lady of Sées.
	Senlis Cathedral	Senlis	Religious	1153–1191	Also known as Notre-Dame de Senlis and as the Cathedral of Our Lady of Senlis.
	Sens Cathedral	Sens	Religious	1135–1534	Also known as the Metropolitan and Primatial Cathedral of Saint Stephen.
	Soissons Cathedral	Soissons	Religious	1177–1479	Also known as the Basilica Cathedral of Saints Gervasius and Protasius.
	Solesmes Abbey	Solesmes, Sarthe	Domestic Religious	11th–19th centuries	Also known as St Peter's Abbey at Solesmes.
	**Strasbourg Cathedral**	Strasbourg	Religious	1015–1439	Also known as Notre-Dame de Strasbourg and as the Cathedral of Our Lady of Strasbourg.
	Toul Cathedral	Toul	Religious	4th–16th centuries	Also known as the Cathedral of Saint Stephen.
	Toulouse Cathedral	Toulouse	Religious	13th–17th centuries	Also known as the Cathedral of St Stephen.
	**Tours Cathedral**	**Tours**	Religious	1170–1547	Also known as the Cathedral of Saint Gatianus of Tours.
	Tréguier Cathedral	Tréguier	Religious	12th century–1470	Also known as the Cathedral of St Tudwal.
	Troyes Cathedral	Troyes	Religious	1208–17th century	Also known as the Cathedral of Saint Peter and Saint Paul.
	Vannes Cathedral	Vannes	Religious	13th–19th centuries	Also known as St Peter's Cathedral of Vannes.
	**Vézelay Abbey**	Vézelay	Domestic Religious	1120–1150	Also known as the Abbey Church of Saint Mary Magdalene.
	Wall of Charles V	Paris	Military	1356–1383	Partially demolished to construct the Wall of Louis XIII in the 1630s. Both were demolished in the 1670s for the construction of the grands boulevards, however, some portions survive (mostly below street level).
	Wall of Philip II Augustus	Paris	Military	1190–1215	Mostly demolished, although many portions survive, mostly due to having been integrated into buildings or continuing to exist below street level. Notable portions include Porte Saint-Michel, Porte Saint-Victor, Tour Barbeau, Tour Saint-Bernard, Tour de Nesle, and Tour du coin.

=== United States ===
Image	Building	Place	Type	Date	Notes
	The Cloisters	Manhattan, New York City	–	–	Also known as the Met Cloisters. Assembled from 1934 to 1938. Mostly constructed of parts of abandoned or ruined medieval structures, predominantly from French abbeys (thus its inclusion here).

== Iberian Peninsula ==
=== Portugal ===
Image	Building	Place	Type	Date	Notes
	**Alcobaça Monastery**	Alcobaça	Domestic Religious		Also known as the Monastery of St Mary of Alcobaça.
	**Batalha Monastery**	Batalha	Domestic Religious	1386–c.1517	Also known as the Monastery of Saint Mary of the Victory.
	**Belém Tower**	Lisbon	Military		Also known as the Tower of St Vincent.
	Carmo Convent	Lisbon	Domestic Religious		Also known as the Convent of Our Lady of Mount Carmel.
	**Castle of Elvas**	Elvas	Military		
	**Castle of Guimarães**	**Historic Centre**, Guimarães			
	**Cathedral of Évora**	**Historic Centre**, Évora	Religious		Also known as the Cathedral-Basilica of Our Lady of the Assumption.
	**Church of St Francis**	**Historic Centre**, Évora	Religious		
	**Church of St Francis**	**Historic Centre**, Porto	Religious		
	**Convent of Christ**	Tomar	Domestic Religious		
	Convent of St Mary	Almoster, Santarém	Domestic Religious		
	Convent of St Francis	São Salvador, Santarém	Domestic Religious		
	Guarda Cathedral	Guarda	Religious		Also known as the Cathedral of the Immaculate Conception. Fortified cathedral.
	Igreja da Graça	Santarém	Religious		
	Igreja de Santa Clara	Santarém	Religious		
	**Igreja de São Domingos**	Elvas	Religious		
	**Igreja de Nossa Senhora da Oliveira**	**Historic Centre**, Guimarães	Religious		
	**Jerónimos Monastery**	Lisbon	Domestic Religious		Also known as the Hieronymites Monastery.
	Lisbon Cathedral	Lisbon	Religious		Also known as the Patriarchal Metropolitan Cathedral of St Mary Major and as the Cathedral of St Mary Major. Ambulatory, cloisters.
	Monastery of Santa Clara-a-Velha	Coimbra	Domestic Religious		Ruins.
	**Old Cathedral of Coimbra**	Coimbra	Religious		Only portions are Gothic, such as the cloisters.
	**Old Cathedral of Elvas**	**Historic Centre**, Elvas	Religious		Also known as Our Lady of the Assumption Cathedral.
	**Palace of the Dukes of Braganza**	**Historic Centre**, Guimarães			
	**Padrão do Salado**	**Historic Centre**, Guimarães	–		
	**Palace of Sintra**	**Sintra**			
	**Pena Convent**	**Sintra**	Domestic Religious	c.13th century–1854	The majority was destroyed by in the 18th century, first by lightning, then by the 1755 Lisbon Earthquake. The surviving portions were restored and added on to create the present palatial structure.
	**Porto Cathedral**	**Historic Centre**, Porto	Religious		Also known as the Cathedral of the Assumption of Our Lady.
	**Royal Palace of Évora**	**Historic Centre**, Évora			
	**St Michael's Chapel**	Coimbra	Religious		Also known as Coimbra University Chapel and as the Chapel of São Miguel.
	Silves Cathedral	Silves	Religious		
	Synagogue of Tomar	Tomar	Religious		
	Viseu Cathedral	Viseu	Religious		Also known as the Cathedral of St Mary.

=== Spain ===
Image	Building	Place	Type	Date	Notes
	**Alcázar of Seville**	Seville			Also known as the Royal Alcázar of Seville. Historically known as al-Qasr al-Muriq.
	Ávila Cathedral	Ávila	Religious		Also known as the Cathedral of the Saviour. Fortified church.
	Barcelona Cathedral	Barcelona	Religious		Also known as the Cathedral of the Holy Cross and St Eulalia.
	Barcelona Royal Shipyard	Barcelona			
	**Burgos Cathedral**	Burgos	Religious	1221–1734	Also known as the Cathedral of St Mary of Burgos and as the Metropolitan Cathedral Basilica of St Mary of Burgos.
	Cathedral of the Saviour	Zaragoza	Religious		Also known as La Seo de Zaragoza.
	Colegio de San Gregorio	Valladolid			
	Girona Cathedral	Girona	Religious		Also known as the Cathedral of St Mary. Has the widest Gothic nave in the world.
	León Cathedral	León	Religious		Also known as Santa María de Regla de León and as the Pulchra Leonina.
	Llotja de Palma	Palma de Mallorca			
	Monastery of San Juan de los Reyes	Toledo	Domestic Religious		
	Monastery of Santes Creus	Santes Creus, Aiguamúrcia	Domestic Religious		Also known as the Monastery of Santa María de Santes Creus.
	Murcia Cathedral	Murcia	Religious		Also known as the Cathedral Church of St Mary.
	Oviedo Cathedral	Oviedo	Religious		Also known as the Metropolitan Cathedral Basilica of the Holy Saviour and as the Cathedral of the Holy Saviour.
	Palace of the Borgias	Valencia			
	Palace of the Kings of Navarre	Olite			
	Palau de la Generalitat de Catalunya	Barcelona			
	Palau Reial Major	Barcelona			
	Palma Cathedral	Palma de Mallorca	Religious		Also known as the Cathedral of St Mary and as La Seu.
	**Poblet Abbey**	Vimbodí i Poblet	Domestic Religious		Also known as the Royal Abbey of St Mary of Poblet.
	Royal Chapel of Granada	Granada	Religious		Also known as Capilla real.
	St Martin's Tower	Teruel			Also known as the Torre de San Martín.
	St Paul's Convent Church	Valladolid	Domestic Religious	1445–1616	Also known as San Pablo Church.
	Santa María de Manresa	Manresa	Religious		Also known as the Collegiate Basilica of St Mary and as La Seu.
	Santa María del Mar	Barcelona	Religious		
	**Seville Cathedral**	Seville	Religious		Also known as the Cathedral of St Mary of the See. The largest Gothic church in the world.
	**Silk Exchange**	Valencia			Also known as Lonja de la Seda and as Llotja de la Seda.
	**Teruel Cathedral**	Teruel	Religious		Also known as the Cathedral of Saint Mary of Mediavilla.
	Toledo Cathedral	Toledo	Religious		Also known as the Primatial Cathedral of Saint Mary.
	Valencia Cathedral	Valencia	Religious		Also known as the Metropolitan Cathedral-Basilica of the Assumption of Our Lady of Valencia and as St Mary's Cathedral.
	Vallbona Abbey	Vallbona de les Monges	Domestic Religious		Also known as the Monastery of St Mary of Vallbona.

=== Spanish Colonies ===
Image	Building	Place	Nation	Type	Date	Notes
	**Basilica Cathedral of Santa María la Menor**	**Santo Domingo**	Dominican Republic	Religious	1504–1550	
	**Church and Convent of the Dominicans**	**Santo Domingo**	Dominican Republic	Domestic Religious	c.1510–1532	Oldest Catholic building in continuous use in the Americas.
	San José Church	Old San Juan	Puerto Rico	Religious	1532–1735	

== Italian Peninsula and Southeastern Europe ==
=== Croatia ===
All of the following existing Gothic buildings are protected cultural properties of Croatia.

Image	Building	Place	Type	Date	Notes
	Korčula Cathedral	Korčula	Religious	1407–c.1550	Also known as the St Mark's Cathedral. It is a former cathedral of the Roman Catholic Diocese of Korčula.
	Monastery of St Francis Assisi	Zadar	Domestic Religious	1221–16th century	The monastery, along with a church of the same name, was built around 1221. It was consecrated on October 12, 1282 by bishop Lovro Periandar.
	Nassis Palace	Zadar	Domestic	15th–18th centuries	The distinguished Croatian naturalist Spiridon Brusina was born in this house in 1845. The street where Nassis Palace is located is also named after him, and his monument stands on the waterfront in front of the university.
	**Rector's Palace**	Dubrovnik	Domestic Military	14th century	Palace which used to serve the as the seat of the rector of the Republic of Ragusa in 14th century. The palace is a part of the **UNESCO** World Heritage Site protection.
	**Sponza Palace**	Dubrovnik	Domestic	1516–1522	Also known as Divona, it became the cultural center of the Republic of Ragusa with the establishment of the Academia dei Concordi, a literary academy, in the 16th century. It is the part of **UNESCO**, World Heritage Site
	**Šibenik Cathedral**	Šibenik	Religious	1431–1535	Also known as the Cathedral of St James or as St Jacob's. Only the initial work on the building is Gothic; the remainder is Renaissance. The cathedral is protected under **UNESCO** World Heritage Site.
	**Trogir Cathedral**	Trogir	Religious	13th century	Also known as the Cathedral of St Lawrence. The cathedral itself is a mix of Romanesque and Venetian gothic architecture, and it's part of **UNESCO**, World Heritage Site.
	**Čipiko Palace**	Trogir	Domestic	15th century	Palace in Trogir, build under the influence of Venetian Gothic architecture, just like the rest of the old town of Trogir, which is a part of **UNESCO**, World Heritage Site.
	St Mark's Church	Zagreb	Religious	13th–14th centuries	It is one of the oldest architectural monuments in Zagreb. It's registered under Cultural Goods of Croatia for its distinctive roof-tiles.
	Zagreb Cathedral	Zagreb	Religious	13th century	Also known as the Cathedral of the Assumption of Mary. With over 100 m height, it's the tallest church in Croatia and Zagreb's most notable monument and landmark.

=== Cyprus ===
Image	Building	Place	Type	Date	Notes
	Cathedral of St Nicholas	Famagusta	Religious		
	Cathedral of St Sophia	Nicosia	Religious		
	Kolossi Castle	Limassol District			
	Limassol Castle	Limassol			
	Ömeriye Mosque	Nicosia	Religious		
	**Panagia Katholiki**	Kouklia	Religious		
	Panagia Stazousa	Pyrga	Religious		
	Panagia tis Angeloktistis	Kiti	Religious	7th–12th centuries	The main body of the church is Byzantine, however, subsequent additions are Gothic. Includes one of the best preserved early Christian wall mosaics.
	Royal Manor House of Kouklia	Paphos District			
	St Catherine's Church	Nicosia	Religious		

=== Greece ===
Image	Building	Place	Type	Date	Notes
	Basilica of St Mark	Heraklion	Religious	13th century	
	Church of Agia Paraskevi	Chalcis	Religious	13th century	
	Church of Presentation of the Lord	Naxos	Religious	13th–16th centuries	
	Church of St Sophia	Andravida	Religious	13th century	Ruins.
	**Daphni Monastery**	Chaidari	Domestic Religious	6th–15th centuries	Built on the site of the ruins of a sanctuary of Apollo.
	Feraklos Castle	Charaki	Military	14th–15th centuries	Also known as Feraklou and as Feraklenon Castle. Ruins.
	Filerimos Monastery	Ialysos	Domestic Religious	Antiquity–15th century	
	**Fortifications of Rhodes**	Rhodes	Military	Antiquity–1522	
	Kos Castle	Kos	Military	1315	
	Our Lady of the Crusades	Heraklion	Religious	13th–15th centuries	Also known as Panagia Stavroforon.
	**Palace of the Grand Master of the Knights of Rhodes**	Rhodes	Domestic Military	7th–14th centuries	Also known as Kastello. Built on the site of the Colossus of Rhodes.
	Zaraka Monastery	Stymfalia	Domestic Religious	13th century	Ruins.

=== Italy ===
Image	Building	Place	Type	Date	Notes
	**Almo collegio Capranica**	**Historic Centre**, Rome			The oldest Roman College.
	**Bargello**	**Historic Centre**, Florence			
	Basilica of Saint Anthony of Padua	Padua	Religious		
	**Basilica of St Francis of Assisi**	Assisi	Religious		
	Bell Tower of Santa Maria in Trivio	Velletri			
	**Ca' d'Oro**	**Venice**			Also known as the Palazzo Santa Sofia.
	**Campo Santo**	**Piazza del Duomo**, Pisa			Also known as the Camposanto monumentale or as the Camposanto vecchio.
	Casamari Abbey	Veroli	Religious		
	**Castel del Monte**	Andria			
	Castello Estense	Ferrara			
	Castello Maniace	Syracuse			
	Castello Ursino	Catania			Also known as the Castello Svevo di Catania.
	Certosa di Pavia	Certosa di Pavia			
	**Doge's Palace**	**Venice**	Civic Domestic	1340–1577	
	Fénis Castle	Fénis			
	Ferrara Cathedral	Ferrara	Religious		Also known as the Cathedral of St George the Martyr. Only portions, such as the façade, are Gothic.
	Ferrara Town Hall	Ferrara	Civic		
	**Florence Baptistery**	**Historic Centre**, Florence	Religious		Also known as the Baptistry of St John.
	**Florence Cathedral**	**Historic Centre**, Florence	Religious		Also known as the Cathedral of St Mary of the Flower.
	Fossanova Abbey	Priverno	Domestic Religious		
	**Giotto's Campanile**	**Historic Centre**, Florence			
	**Madonna dell'Orto**	**Venice**			
	Milan Cathedral	Milan	Religious		Also known as the Metropolitan Cathedral-Basilica of the Nativity of Saint Mary.
	Orvieto Cathedral	Orvieto	Religious		Also known as the Cathedral of the Assumption of the Virgin Mary.
	Palace of the Popes	Viterbo			
	**Palazzo Pubblico**	**Siena**			
	**Palazzo Vecchio**	**Historic Centre**, Florence			
	**Piazza del Campo**	**Siena**			
	**Pienza Cathedral**	**Historic Centre**, Pienza	Religious		Also known as the Concathedral of the Assumption of the Virgin Mary.
	**Pisa Baptistery**	**Piazza del Duomo**, Pisa	Religious		Also known as the Baptistery of St John.
	San Francesco	Bologna	Religious		Also known as the Basilica of St Francis.
	San Francesco de' Ferri	Pisa	Religious		
	San Lorenzo Maggiore	Naples	Religious		
	San Michele in Borgo	Pisa	Religious		
	San Petronio	Bologna	Religious		Also known as the Basilica of St Petronius.
	**Santa Croce**	**Historic Centre**, Florence	Religious		Also known as the Basilica of the Holy Cross.
	**Santa Maria del Carmine**	**Historic Centre**, Florence	Religious		
	Santa Maria della Spina	Pisa	Religious		Formerly known as Santa Maria di Pontenovo.
	**Santa Maria Gloriosa dei Frari**	**Venice**	Religious		Also known as the Frari.
	**Santa Maria Novella**	**Historic Centre**, Florence	Religious		Also known as the Basilica of Santa Maria novella.
	**Santa Maria sopra Minerva**	**Historic Centre**, Rome	Religious		Also known as the Basilica of St Mary Above Minerva. The only standing Gothic church in Rome to retain its Gothic appearance.
	Scaliger Castle	Sirmione			
	Scolanova Synagogue	Trani	Religious		
	**Siena Cathedral**	**Siena**	Religious		Also known as the Metropolitan Cathedral of the Assumption of Saint Mary.

=== Other countries ===
Most of these countries have only a few surviving Gothic buildings, and in many cases the Gothic architectural style never took.

Image	Building	Place	Nation	Type	Date	Notes
	Arap Mosque	Karaköy, Istanbul	Turkey	Religious	1323–1325	
	Bobovac	Kakanj	Bosnia and Herzegovina	–	c.1349–c.1493	Ruins. Fortified city.
	The Cenacle and David's Tomb	Mount Zion	Israel	Religious	4th–12th centuries	Also known as the Upper Room.
	Church of Saint Mary	Morović	Serbia	Religious	12th–13th centuries	
	**Krak des Chevaliers**	Al-Husn	Syria	Domestic Military Religious	1142–1170	Crusader castle.
	Palazzo Falson	Mdina	Malta	Domestic	c.1495–16th century	Formerly known as the Palazzo Cumbo-Navarra Casa dei Castelletti or as the Norman House. Presently houses the Palazzo Falson Historic House Museum. Second oldest building in Mdina.
	Palazzo Santa Sofia	Mdina	Malta	Domestic	1233–1938	Only the ground floor is Gothic: the second story was added in 1938. Oldest building in Mdina.
	Prince's Palace of Monaco	Monaco City	Monaco	Civic Domestic Military Religious	1191–19th century	Only the initial portions of the building are Gothic.
	St Mary's Church	Jajce	Bosnia and Herzegovina	Religious	12th–15th centuries	Also known as Sultan Suleiman's Mosque, as Fethija, and as St Luke's Church. Its adjoining bell tower is known as Saint Luke's Bell Tower. Ruins.
	Shirgj Church	Shirgj	Albania	Religious	1290	Also known as the Monastery of Sts Sergius and Bacchus. Ruins.
	St Mary's Chapel	Bir Miftuħ	Malta	Religious	c.1430	Also known as the Medieval Chapel of the Assumption of St Mary.
	Tarsus Old Mosque	Tarsus	Turkey	Religious	c.1102–1415	

== Low Lands ==
=== Belgium ===
Image	Building	Place	Type	Date	Notes
	**Antwerp Cathedral**	Antwerp	Religious	1352–1521	Also known as the Cathedral of Our Lady of Antwerp.
	**Basilica of Our Lady**	Tongeren	Religious	1240–1541	Also known as the Old Cathedral of Tongeren.
	**Belfry of Bruges**	Bruges	Civic Military	c. 1240	
	**Belfry of Ghent**	Ghent	Civic Military	1313–1380	
	**Belfry of Tournai**	Tournai	Civic Military	c.1188	
	**Bruges City Hall**	Bruges	Civic	1376–1421	
	**Brussels Town Hall**	Brussels	Civilc	1401–1455	Located in the **Grand-Place/Grote Markt**.
	Cathedral of St Michael and St Gudula	Brussels	Religious	9th century–1519	
	Church of Our Lady of Victories at the Sablon	Sablon/Zavel, Brussels	Religious	15th century	Also known as the Church of Our Lady of the Sablon.
	**Church of Our Lady**	Bruges	Religious	1270–1280	Has the third tallest brickwork tower in the world.
	**Church of Our Lady of the Chapel**	Marolles/Marollen, Brussels	Religious	12th–13th centuries	Also known as the Chapel Church.
	Church of St Denis	Liège	Military Religious	1003–15th century	Fortified church. One of the seven collegiate churches of Liège.
	**Collegiate Church of St Peter and St Guido**	Anderlecht, Brussels	Religious	14th–16th centuries	
	**Hospital of St John**	Bruges	Civic	12th–19th centuries	Also known as Old St John's Hospital.
	Leuven Town Hall	Leuven	Civic	1448–1469	Located on Leuven's Grote Markt opposite the church.
	**Maria-Magdalenakerk**	Brussels	Religious	15th century	
	**Mechelen City Hall**	Mechelen	Civic	1311–1526	
	**Oudenaarde Town Hall**	Oudenaarde	Civic	1526–1537	
	St Bavo's Cathedral	Ghent	Religious	13th–16th centuries	Houses the Ghent Altarpiece.
	**St Leonard's Church**	Zoutleeuw	Religious	1231–16th century	
	St. Nicholas Church	Ghent	Religious	13th century	
	St Quentin's Church	Leuven	Religious	1222–1535	
	**St Rumbold's Cathedral**	Mechelen	Religious	1200–1520	Also known as Mechelen Cathedral.
	**St Peter's Church**	Leuven	Religious	1425–1500	Located on Leuven's Grote Markt opposite the town hall.
	Tafelrond	Leuven	Domestic	1480–1487	The original building was torn down in 1818, this second building was laid to ruins in 1914; the present building is based on the original Gothic one.
	**Tournai Cathedral**	Tournai	Religious	1140–1255	Also known as the Cathedral of Our Lady of Tournai.
	**Forest/Vorst Abbey**	Forest, Brussels	Domestic Religious	13th century	Of the Gothic buildings, only the Church of St Denis survives.
	Ypres Cloth Hall	Ypres	Civic	Completed 1304.	Was largely destroyed in the Battle of Ypres; it was subsequently meticulously repaired and reconstructed.

=== Luxembourg ===
Image	Building	Place	Type	Date	Notes
	Beaufort Castle	Beaufort	Domestic Military	11th–16th centuries	Ruins.
	Brandenbourg Castle	Brandenbourg	Domestic Military	13th century	Ruins.
	Hostert Cemetery Chapel	Hostert	Religious	14th century	
	Dënzelt	Echternach	Civic	c.1236	
	Nidderwolz Church	Nidderwolz, Wiltz	Religious	1510–1937	Also known as the Church of Saints Peter and Paul.
	Notre-Dame Cathedral	Luxembourg	Religious	1613–1938	
	St Laurence's Church	Dikrech	Religious	c.6th century–1467	Also known as the Old Church of Dikrech.
	St Michael's Church	Luxembourg	Religious	1443–1688	
	Trinitarian Church	Vianden	Religious	1248–1644	

=== Netherlands ===
All of the following existing Gothic buildings are state monuments.

Image	Building	Place	Type	Date	Notes
	Agnietenkapel	Amsterdam	Religious		
	Amsterdam Nieuwe Kerk	Amsterdam	Religious		
	Amsterdam Oude Kerk	Amsterdam	Religious		
	Baarland Castle	Baarland	Domestic Military	14th century	Ruins.
	Basilica of St Plechelm	Oldenzaal	Religious		
	Basilica of St Servatius	Maastricht	Religious		
	Breda Grote Kerk	Breda	Religious		Also known as the Church of Our Lady of Breda.
	Buurkerk	Utrecht	Religious		
	Crosier Monastery	Maastricht	Domestic Religious		
	Delft Nieuwe Kerk	Delft	Religious		
	Delft Oude Kerk	Delft	Religious		
	Dinghuis	Maastricht	Civic		
	Dordrecht Grote Kerk	Dordrecht	Religious		Also known as the Church of Our Lady of Dordrecht.
	Great Church or St James' Church	The Hague	Religious		
	Gouda Old City Hall	Gouda	Civic		
	Grote or Sint-Laurenskerk	Rotterdam	Religious		
	Haarlem City Hall	Haarlem	Civic		
	Haarlem Grote Kerk	Haarlem	Religious		Also known as the Church of St Bavo.
	Hooglandse Kerk	Leiden	Religious		
	Koppelpoort	Amersfoort	Military		
	Martinikerk	Groningen	Religious		
	Middelburg Abbey	Middelburg	Domestic Religious		
	Middelburg Town Hall	Middelburg	Civic		
	Munsterkerk	Roermond	Religious		
	Pieterskerk	Leiden	Religious		
	Protestant Church of Buitenpost	Buitenpost	Religious		
	Ridderzaal	The Hague	Civic		
	St Bavo's Church	Aardenburg	Religious		
	St Christopher's Cathedral	Roermond	Religious		
	St Eusebius' Church	Arnhem	Religious		
	Saint John's Cathedral	's-Hertogenbosch	Religious		Also known as the Cathedral Basilica of St John the Evangelist.
	Saint John's Church	Maastricht	Religious		
	St Martin's Cathedral	Utrecht	Religious		
	St Mary's Church	Bears	Religious		Also known as the Protestant Church of Bears.
	Sint-Lievensmonstertoren	Zierikzee	Religious		
	Tower of Our Lady	Amersfoort	Religious		

== Nordics ==
=== Estonia ===
Image	Building	Place	Type	Date	Notes
	Church of the Holy Spirit	**Old Town**, Tallinn	Religious	13th century	
	Great Guild	**Old Town**, Tallinn	Civic	1407–1417	Currently houses the Estonian History Museum.
	Haapsalu Castle	Haapsalu	Military		Also known as Haapsalu Episcopal Castle or as Haapsalu Bishop's Castle.
	Haapsalu Cathedral	Haapsalu	Religious		Also known as St Nicholas Cathedral of Haapsalu.
	Hermann Castle	Narva	Military		
	Karja Church	Linnaka	Religious		
	Kihelkonna Church	Kihelkonna	Religious		Also known as Kihelkonna St Michael's Church.
	Koluvere Castle	Koluvere	Military		Also known as Koluvere Episcopal Castle or as Koluere Bishop's Castle.
	Kuressaare Castle	Kuressaare	Military		Also known as Kuressaare Episcopal Castle or as Kuressaare Bishop's Castle.
	Muhu Church	Liiva, Muhu	Religious		Also known as Muhu St Catherine's Church.
	Padise Abbey	Padise	Domestic Religious	c. 1250–1448	
	Pirita Convent	Tallinn	Domestic Religious	1417–c. 1436	Ruins. Destroyed in the Livonian War in 1577. Its church was once the largest in Estonia.
	Pöide Church	Pöide Commune	Religious	c. 1230–14th century	Also known as Pöide St Mary's Church.
	Saha Chapel	Saha	Religious	c. 1407	Also known as Saha St Nicholas Chapel.
	St Catherine's Monastery	**Old Town**, Tallinn	Domestic Religious	1249–1525	Also known as St Catharine's Dominican Monastery.
	St John's Church	Tartu	Religious	1323–20th century	
	St John's Church	Viljandi	Religious	Late 13th century	
	St Mary's Cathedral	**Old Town**, Tallinn	Religious	1229–1430	Also known as the Episcopal Cathedral of the Holy Virgin Mary, Tallinn.
	St. Nicholas Church	Tallinn	Religious	c. 1230–1515	Only surviving church in Estonia to escape the Reformation's iconoclasm untouched. Presently part of the Art Museum of Estonia.
	St Olaf's Church	Tallinn	Religious	12th–14th centuries	
	Tallinn City Wall	**Old Town**, Tallinn	Military	13th–16th centuries	
	Tallinn Town Hall	**Old Town**, Tallinn	Civic	13th century–1404	
	Tartu Cathedral	Tartu	Religious	13th–16th centuries	Also known as Dorpat Cathedral or as the Cathedral of Saints Peter and Paul in Tartu. Partial ruin.
	Toompea Castle	**Old Town**, Tallinn	Domestic Military	13th–16th centuries	
	Valjala Church	Valjala	Religious	c. 1230–14th century	Also known as St Martin's Church. Fortified church.
	Viljandi Castle	Viljandi	Domestic Military	13th century	Ruins. Slighted in the 17th century.

=== Finland ===
Image	Building	Place	Type	Date	Notes
	Espoo Cathedral	Espoo	Religious	1485–19th century	
	Holy Cross Church	Hattula	Religious	1472–1490	
	Naantali Abbey	Naantali	Domestic Religious	1443–c. 1450	The church and a few fragments survive.
	Porvoo Cathedral	Porvoo	Religious	13th–15th centuries	
	St Catherine's Church	Turku	Religious	c. 1440 – c. 1450	
	St Clement's Church	Sauvo	Religious	1460–1472	
	St Henry's Church	Pyhtää	Religious	c. 1465	
	St Lawrence's Church	Lohja	Religious	c. 1470 – c. 1490	
	St Mary's Church	Hollola	Religious	1495–1510	
	St Mary's Church	Turku	Religious	c. 1440–c. 1490	
	St Sigfrid's Church	Sipoo	Religious	1450–1454	
	Turku Cathedral	Turku	Religious	13th–15th centuries	Partially destroyed by fires, primarily in 1827.

=== Kingdom of Denmark ===
==== Denmark ====
All of the following existing Gothic buildings are either listed buildings or protected monuments of Denmark.

Image	Building	Place	Type	Date	Notes
	Aarhus Cathedral	Aarhus	Religious	1190–1500	Also known as St Clement's Church. Longest and tallest church in Denmark.
	Odense Cathedral	Odense	Religious	c.1300–1499	Also known as St Canute's Cathedral.
	**Roskilde Cathedral**	Roskilde	Religious	c.1170–1636	
	Sand-Covered Church	Skagen	Religious	1355–1475	Also known as the Buried Church, as Old Skagen Church., and as St Lawrence's Church. Due to the encroaching sand dunes, the church was abandoned in 1795 and aside from the tower demolished. Only 59 ft of the 72 ft tower is visible today.

==== Faroe Islands ====
Image	Building	Place	Type	Date	Notes
	Magnus Cathedral	Kirkjubøur	Religious	c.1300–16th century	Ruins. Possibly unfinished.

=== Norway ===
All of the following existing Gothic buildings are cultural heritage sites of Norway.

Image	Building	Place	Type	Date	Notes
	Nidaros Cathedral	Trondheim	Religious	1070–1300	World's northernmost medieval cathedral. Coronation church of Norway.
	Stavanger Cathedral	Stavanger	Religious	c.1125–13th century	Also known as the Cathedral of St Swithun. Norway's oldest cathedral.
	Trondenes Church	Harstad	Religious	c.1435	World's northernmost medieval building and Norway's northernmost stone church.

=== Sweden ===
All of the following existing Gothic buildings are either listed buildings or otherwise registered buildings of Sweden.

Image	Building	Place	Type	Dates	Notes
	Bunge Church	Bunge	Military Religious	14th century	Fortified church.
	Gammelgarn Church	Gammelgarn	Military Religious	12th–14th centuries	Fortified church.
	Liberiet	Lund	–	15th century	
	Linköping Cathedral	Linköping	Religious	c.1120–1520	
	St Gertrude's Church	Gamla stan, Stockholm	Religious	1570s	Also known as the German Church of Stockholm.
	St Peter's Church	Malmö	Religious	14th century	
	Skara Cathedral	Skara	Religious	11th century–1760s	
	Storkyrkan	Gamla stan, Stockholm	Religious	13th century–1778	Also known as the Cathedral of St. Nicholas. Oldest church in Stockholm.
	Strängnäs Cathedral	Strängäs	Religious	c.1260–1400s	
	Uppsala Cathedral	Uppsala	Religious	1272–1893	Also known as the Metropolitan Cathedral Church of Uppsala and as St Erik's Cathedral.
	Vadstena Abbey	Vadstena	Domestic Religious	1346–16th century	Also known as the Abbey Pax Mariae.
	Visby Cathedral	Visby	Religious	12th century–1432	Also known as St Mary's Cathedral.

== See also ==
- Gothicmed
- List of Brick Gothic buildings
- List of Gothic Revival buildings
