= Igreja de Santa Clara (Santarém) =

Church in Santarém, Santarém District, Portugal

Coordinates: 39.5624738°N 8.1274996°W

Igreja de Santa Clara is a church in Portugal. It is classified as a National Monument.
