= Loggia Palace =

Building in Koper, Slovenia

Coordinates: 45°32′54.34″N 13°43′47.04″E

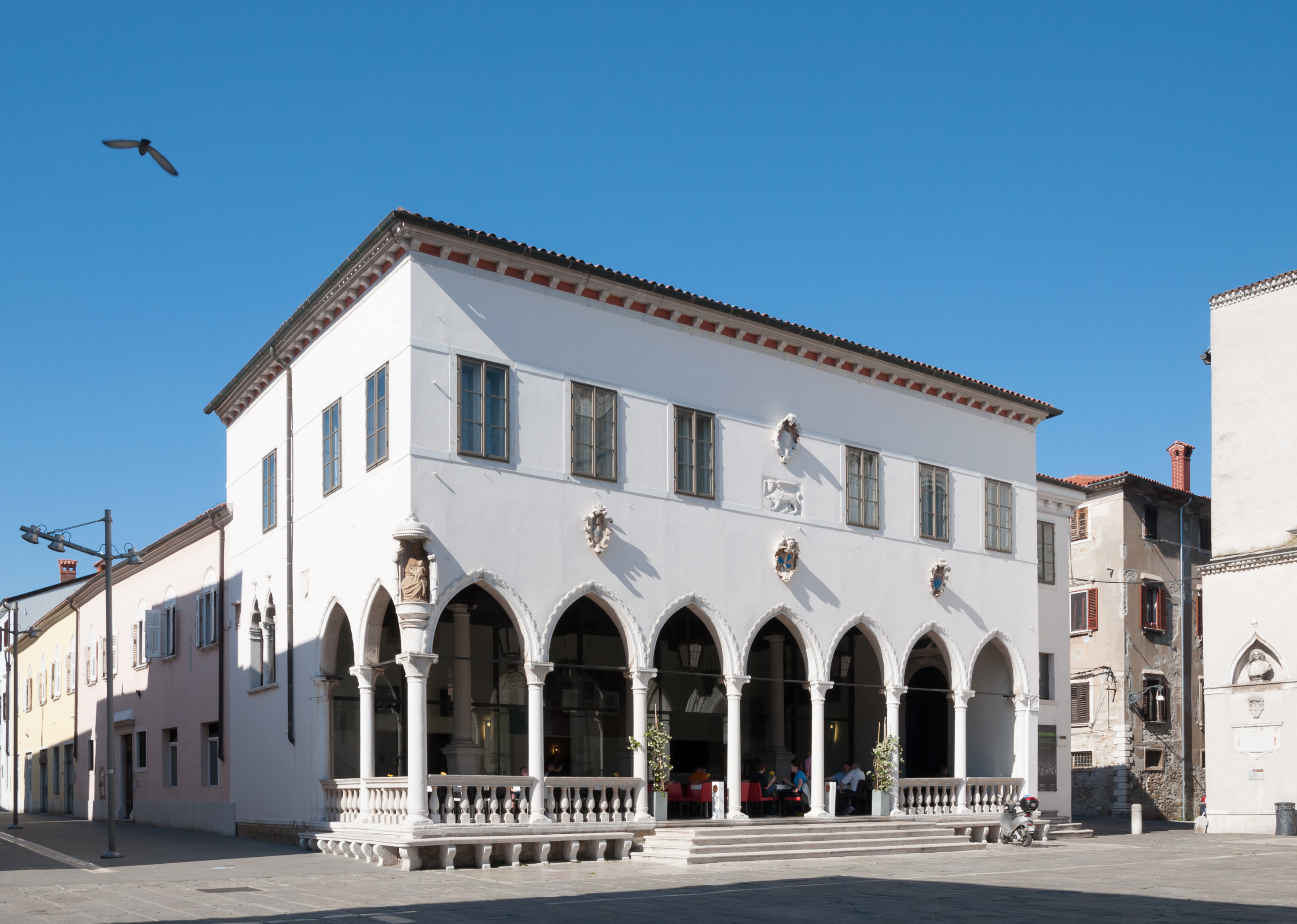
Loggia Palace in Koper

The Loggia Palace (Italian: palazzo della Loggia) is a Venetian Gothic palace in Koper, a port town in southwestern Slovenia. It is the only preserved Gothic town hall in Slovenia.

== History ==
The earliest part of the existing building dates from 1462, when building work began on a replacement for an earlier Loggia that had stood in the same position on the north side of the main square of Koper, opposite the Praetorian Palace.

Following a plague outbreak in Koper in 1553-1555, the facade of the Loggia was embellished with coats-of-arms, and a terracotta statue of the Madonna and Child was erected in a niche above the left corner column.

Further work was carried out in 1698, when a second storey was added and the facade was extended with two additional arches taken from the west side of the palace.

The Loggia currently houses a cafe on the ground floor. In the second floor, it houses an art gallery operated by the Piran Coastal Galleries.
