= Fontana Delle Tette =

Fountain in Treviso, Italy

Coordinates: 45.6663°N 12.2450°E

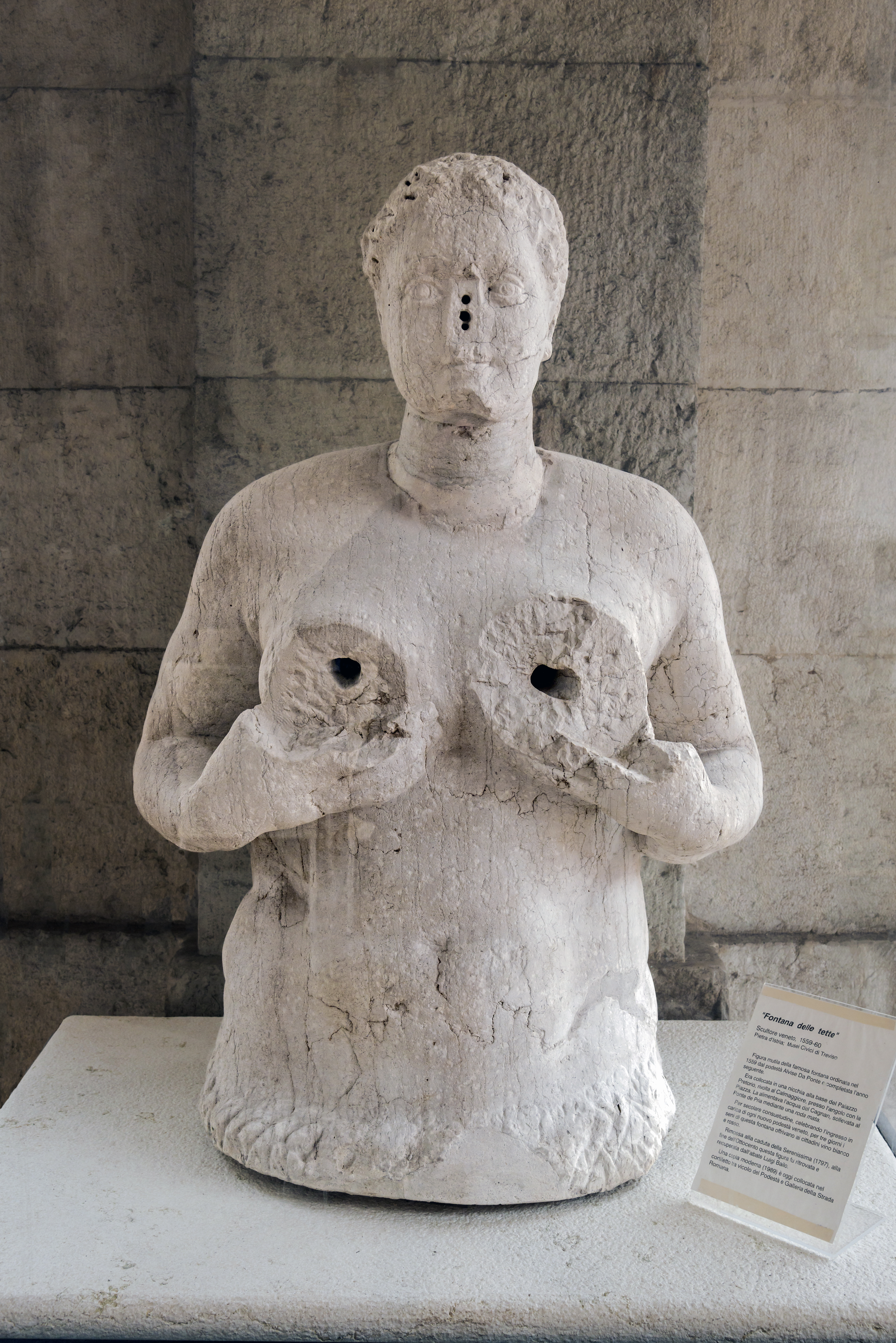
The Fontana delle Tette 1559-1560

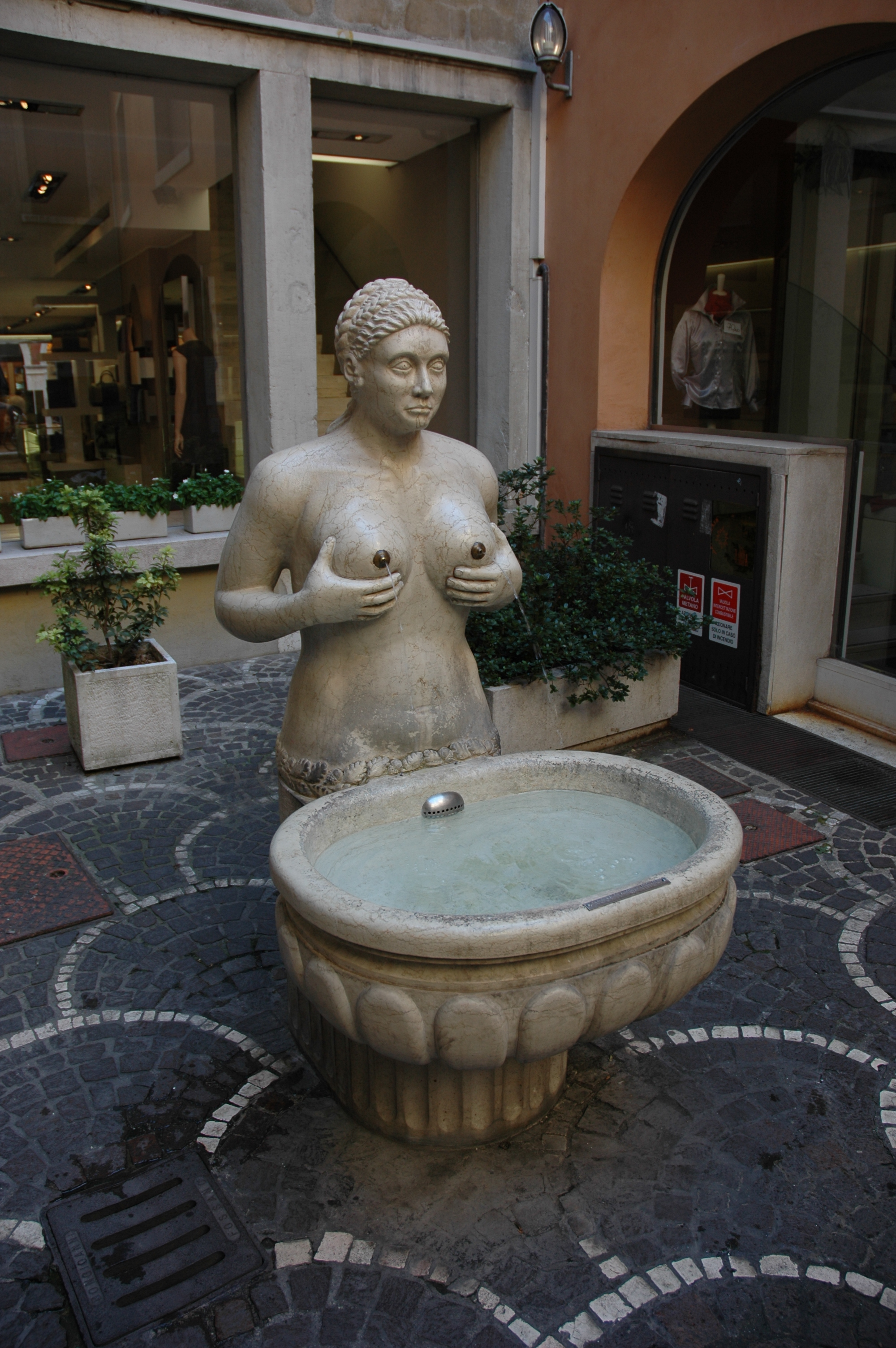
The Fontana delle Tette.

The Fountana de łe tete is an old fountain in Treviso, Italy. Under the Venetian Republic it poured white and red wine during special celebrations. The name translates into English as "The Fountain of Tits" and is usually translated in Italian as "Fontana delle tette". It features a topless woman squeezing her breasts and water (representing breast milk) coming out of her nipples.

The Fontana de łe tete was built in 1559 on the orders of Alvise Da Ponte, at the time mayor of the Republic of Venice, as a result of a severe drought that struck the city of Treviso and the surrounding countryside. Originally the statue was placed inside the Praetorian Palace, in via Calmaggiore. In the autumn of every year, in honor of every new Podesta, red wine flowed from the nipple of one breast, and white wine from nipple of the other breast, and all citizens could drink the wine for free for three days.

There is a plaque near the fountain that says:

Located at the beginning of Calmaggiore street and so has described her Matteo Sernagiotto (1810-1888): ... lovely lady over the marble basin marina with both hands was squeezing her swollen breasts, and two living fountains of crystal clear water, thanks to industrious contraption with wheels, removed to the nearby Cagnano, offering plenty of liquor houses and shops nearby. Alvise Da Ponte judge, following an extraordinary drought, built in 1559, and from that time until the fall of the Venetian republic, every year for three consecutive days, to celebrate the entry of a new mayor, the fountain poured from one Stern undiluted white wine, black and the other, for the joy of the people cheering ... It was rebuilt in 1989.

== See also ==
- Toplessness in art
