= Igor Pribac =

Slovenian philosopher (born 1958)

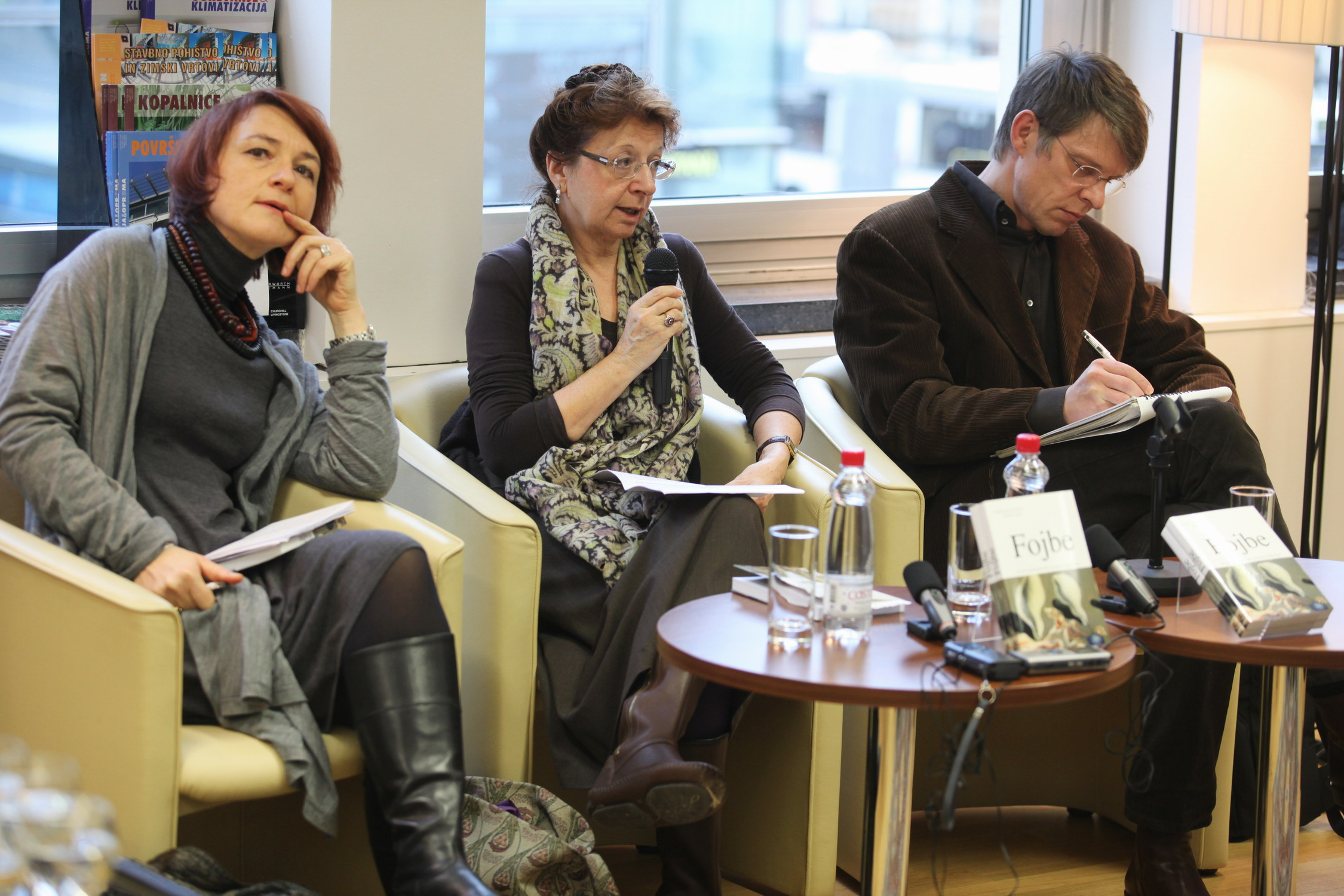
- Igor Pribac in Ljubljana, together with historians Marta Verginella (left) and Luisa Accati (centre).
- Born: 1958 (age 67–68); Koper, FPR Yugoslavia

Education
- Education: University of Ljubljana

Igor Pribac (born 1958) is a Slovenian philosopher and political commentator.

== Life ==
Born in Koper in the Slovenian Littoral, then part of Yugoslavia, where he attended high school. He studied philosophy and sociology at the University of Ljubljana. He obtained a MA with a thesis on Spinoza's criticism of Descartes under the supervision of the philosopher Božidar Debenjak. In 1998, he obtained a PhD with a thesis on natural law in Hobbes and Spinoza. From 1985 to 2021, he was a professor at the Faculty of Arts of the University of Ljubljana.

== Work ==
He has translated several philosophical texts from English and Italian, including Will Kymlicka, Paolo Virno, Cesare Beccaria, and Thomas Hobbes.

He has also written on a variety of subjects, including psychology and psychoanalysis, natural law, early modern political theory, and the notion of post-modernism. He has published several reflections on contemporary issues, including on animal rights, television, and the changing role of marriage in post-modern societies, from a philosophical perspective. He has been a supporter of euthanasia and of the basic income.

== Major works ==
- Gledanje televizije ('Watching Television', Ljubljana: ŠOU, 1993)
- Očetov delež ('The Share of the Father', Ljubljana: ČKZ, 1993)
- Prava poroka? : 12 razmišljanj o zakonski zvezi, with Zdravko Kobe ('True Marriage: 12 Reflections on Matrimony', Ljubljana: Krtina, 2006)
