= Praetorian Palace =

Venetian Gothic palace in Koper, Slovenia

Coordinates: 45°32′52.52″N 13°43′46.64″E

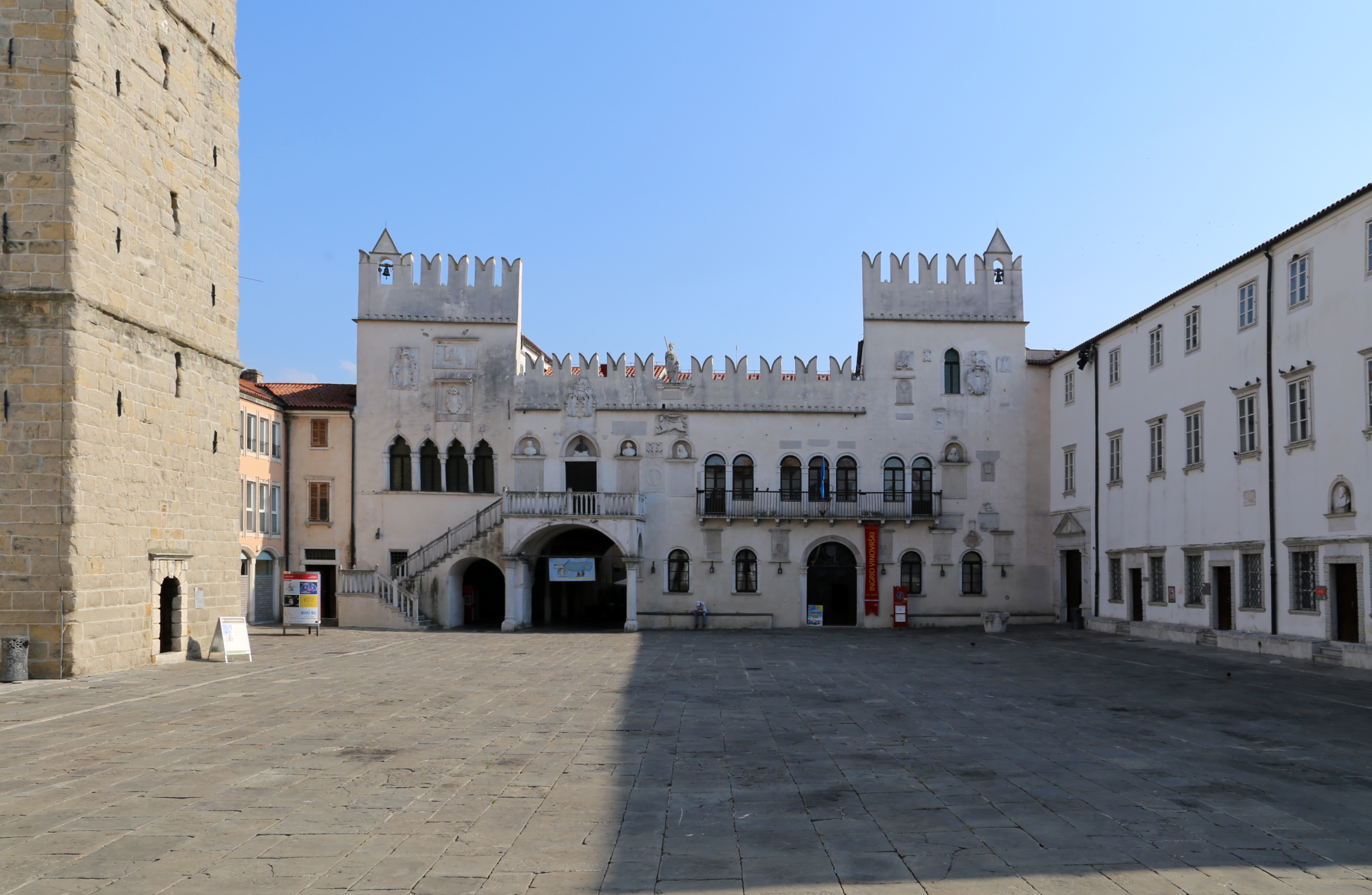
Praetorian Palace with Tito Square

The Praetorian Palace (Slovene: Pretorska palača, Italian: palazzo Pretorio) is a 15th-century Venetian Gothic palace in the city of Koper, in southwest Slovenia. Located on the southern side of the city's central Tito Square (at Titov trg/piazza Tito 3), it houses the Koper city government and a wedding hall. It is considered one of the city's architectural landmarks.

== History ==
An earlier municipal hall existed on the same site by 1254, before the square itself (then called the Platei Comunis, established around 1268.) Work on a new building began after the original was destroyed during a major revolt in 1348, but the incomplete building was again destroyed in 1380 by a Genoese raid that sacked and burned the city in that year, during the War of Chioggia. The current structure dates from the mid-15th century, having been begun in 1452-1453.

The left wing and the portico leading from the square to the colorful via Calegaria (Čevljarska ulica, "Cobblers' Street") were the first to be completed, while the right wing dates from the 1480s. In 1505, the Porto del Corte was added; the renaissance gateway supports a small terrace and connected the Praetorian Palace with the Foresteria.

The external staircase facing Tito Square was completed in 1447. In 1481, Giovanni Vitturi replaced peaked Gothic windows with semicircular Renaissance ones. The arms of the city governors on the facade attest to the fact that the balustrade was not completed until the beginning of the 16th century. The center of the crenellated portico features a statue of Lady Justice.

The main facade took its present shape in 1664, when a thorough renovation rearranged the numerous plaques and arms set into it. Additional ornaments and signage are fixed into the palace's Cobblers' Street wall, testifying to its status during the time it served as the seat of the city podestà (a joint civil and military authority), the Captaincy, and the Grand Council (an assembly of the city's nobility).

The fall of the Venetian Republic to Napoleon I in 1797 caused the palace to lose much of its importance, as the deliberative bodies that had met in it were now defunct. During the 19th century, Austrian authorities moved the seat of the mayoralty to the Armerija Palace. Interwar plans by Italy, which had gained Koper in 1918, to restore it as the municipal seat were not realized. The palace continued to gradually decay until 1968/1969, when it was rehabilitated in situ, and a restaurant called "Capris" was opened in the ground floor. A more thorough renovation was carried out between 1991 and 2001, at a cost of 800 million SIT (3.34 million €). After its completion, the palace resumed its historic role as city hall; the offices of the mayor and the municipal council of Koper were relocated to it in May 2001.
