= List of World Heritage Sites in Belarus =

Location of UNESCO World Heritage Sites in Belarus. Blue dots represent the sites of the Struve Geodetic Arc.

The United Nations Educational, Scientific and Cultural Organization (UNESCO) World Heritage Sites are places of importance to cultural or natural heritage as described in the UNESCO World Heritage Convention, established in 1972. Cultural heritage consists of monuments (such as architectural works, monumental sculptures, or inscriptions), groups of buildings, and sites (including archaeological sites). Natural heritage consists of natural features (physical and biological formations), geological and physiographical formations (including habitats of threatened species of animals and plants), and natural sites which are important from the point of view of science, conservation, or natural beauty. Belarus accepted the convention on 12 October 1988, making its natural and historical sites eligible for inclusion on the list.

As of 2021, there are four World Heritage Sites in Belarus. The first site added to the list was the Białowieża Forest in 1992, representing an extension to the site previously listed in Poland in 1979. This is the only natural site in Belarus, the other three are cultural. In addition to Białowieża Forest, the Struve Geodetic Arc is also a transnational site, and is shared with nine other countries. In addition, Belarus has six sites listed on the tentative list.

== World Heritage Sites ==
UNESCO lists sites under ten criteria; each entry must meet at least one of the criteria. Criteria i through vi are cultural, and vii through x are natural.

* Transnational site

World Heritage Sites
Site	Image	Location (region)	Year listed	UNESCO data	Description
Białowieża Forest*	Forest scenery, some broken trees	Brest Region and Grodno Region	1992	33ter; vii (natural)	Białowieża Forest is a large forest complex, including extensive old-growth forests, on the border between Poland and Belarus. It is an example of the Central European mixed forests terrestrial ecoregion, and a range of associated non-forest habitats, including wet meadows, river valleys, and other wetlands. The area is home to the largest free-roaming population of European bison, as well as wolf, lynx, and otter. The Polish part of the site was first added to the list in 1979. The part in Belarus, Belovezhskaya Pushcha, was added in 1992, while the year 2014 saw a large extension of the protected area.
Mir Castle Complex	Red brick castle with several towers	Grodno Region	2000	625; ii, iv (cultural)	Mir Castle is located in an area with a turbulent history, which influenced its development. The construction begun at the end of the 15th century, in Gothic style. Later reconstructions were done under Renaissance and Baroque influences. It was heavily damaged during the Napoleonic Wars and restored in the late 19th century.
Struve Geodetic Arc*	A stone pillar with the inscription about the site. Trees behind.	Brest Region and Grodno Region	2005	1187; ii, iii, vi (cultural)	The Struve Geodetic Arc is a series of triangulation points, stretching over a distance of 2,820 kilometres (1,750 mi) from Hammerfest in Norway to the Black Sea. The points were set up in a survey by the astronomer Friedrich Georg Wilhelm von Struve who first carried out an accurate measurement of a long segment of a meridian, which helped to establish the size and shape of the Earth. Originally, there were 265 station points. The World Heritage Site includes 34 points in ten countries (North to South: Norway, Sweden, Finland, Russia, Estonia, Latvia, Lithuania, Belarus, Moldova, Ukraine), five of which are in Belarus (site marker in Tupiški pictured).
Architectural, Residential and Cultural Complex of the Radziwill Family at Nesvizh	Palace courtyard surrounded with yellow buildings. A well in the middle.	Minsk Region	2005	1196; ii, iv, vi (cultural)	Nesvizh Castle was the home of the Radziwiłł family, Polish magnates who built and maintained the castle from the 16th century to 1939. The Radziwiłłs were patrons of sciences and arts and invited artists, craftsmen, and architects to the town of Nesvizh. These interactions helped transmit the trends from Southern and Western Europe to Central and Eastern Europe. The complex comprises the residential castle and the Corpus Christi mausoleum-church, along with their landscaped setting.

== Tentative list ==
In addition to sites inscribed on the World Heritage List, member states can maintain a list of tentative sites that they may consider for nomination. Nominations for the World Heritage List are only accepted if the site was previously listed on the tentative list. Belarus lists six properties on its tentative list.

Tentative sites
Site	Image	Location (region)	Year listed	UNESCO criteria	Description
Augustow Canal*	River canal, vegetation on both sides	Grodno Region	2004	i, ii (cultural)	The Augustow Canal was built in 1823–1839, to provide a direct link between the two major rivers, Vistula River (through the Biebrza River – a tributary of the Narew River), and the Neman River (through its tributary – the Czarna Hancza River). Furthermore, it provided a link with the Black Sea to the south through the Oginski Canal, Daugava River, Berezina Canal and Dnieper River. It allowed the trade routes to bypass the territory of Eastern Prussia, which had earlier introduced high customs duties for transit of Polish and Lithuanian goods through its territory. Technical heritage of the canal includes locks, weirs, towpaths, as well as roads and bridges. The canal is now located in the territories of Belarus and Poland, thus making the nomination transnational.
Saviour Transfiguration Church and St. Sophia Cathedral in the town of Polatsk	White church with green roof and two bell towers, side view	Vitebsk Region	2004	i, ii (cultural)	The Saviour Transfiguration Church was built between 1152 and 1161 in the ancient Rus' style by the order of the princess St. Euphrosyne of Polatsk. From the 16th to the 19th century it was used by the Jesuits. The Saint Sophia Cathedral was originally built in the 11th century, but rebuilt first after the 1447 fire and then in the 18th century after the Great Northern War, this time in the Baroque style. The main facade is embellished with Rococo-style ornamental elements.
SS. Boris and Gleb (Kalozha) Church in the city of Hrodna	Church made of brick and stone, side view	Grodno Region	2004	i, ii (cultural)	The church was built in the 1180s in brick and stone. In the following centuries, the church saw series of renovations, as well as a partial collapse due to a landslide of the high bank of the river Nieman, where the church is located. Two walls, three apses, and two pillars remain from the original structure. It is still an active place of worship.
Edifices for Worship of Fortress Type in Belarus, Poland and Lithuania	White and red church with two bell towers, side view	Grodno Region and Vitebsk Region	2004	i (cultural)	This nomination currently includes three fortified churches in Belarus, the Church of the Nativity of the Blessed Virgin Mary in Muravanka (pictured), the Church of St. Michael in Synkavichy, and the Church of Saint John the Baptist in Kamai. The churches were built in the 16th and 17th centuries and were often renovated due to the damage following warfare or fires.
Worship wooden architecture (17th–18th centuries) in Polesye	Blue wooden church with a single bell tower in the middle, side view	Brest Region	2004	i, ii, iii (cultural)	This nomination covers the wooden architecture in the Polesye region, wood being the main building material for centuries. In the 17th and 18th centuries, two types of the Polesye architectural schools emerged: of the Western Polesye and of the Eastern Polesye. An example is the St. Nikita Church in Zditovo (pictured), which was first built in 1502 and later expanded.
Memorials to the Heroes of the Great Patriotic War: Brest Fortress and Mamayev Kurgan*	Monument to a soldier with a brick fortress in the background	Brest Region	2024	ii, iv, vi (cultural)	This nomination comprises two memorial sites to the Great Patriotic War, or the Eastern Front of World War II - Brest Fortress in Belarus and Mamayev Kurgan in Russia. Brest Fortress was the site of the German attack on the Soviet Union in 1941. A memorial complex was constructed in the late 1960s and early 1970s. Artistically, it blends the aesthetics of the Classical antiquity and modern period to display feelings of patriotism, sacrifice, heroism, and grief for the fallen. Both memorial complexes contributed to the development of the heroic Soviet art style which became prominent in socialist countries.
