= Belarusian Gothic =

Architectural style of 15th- and 16th-century Eastern Europe

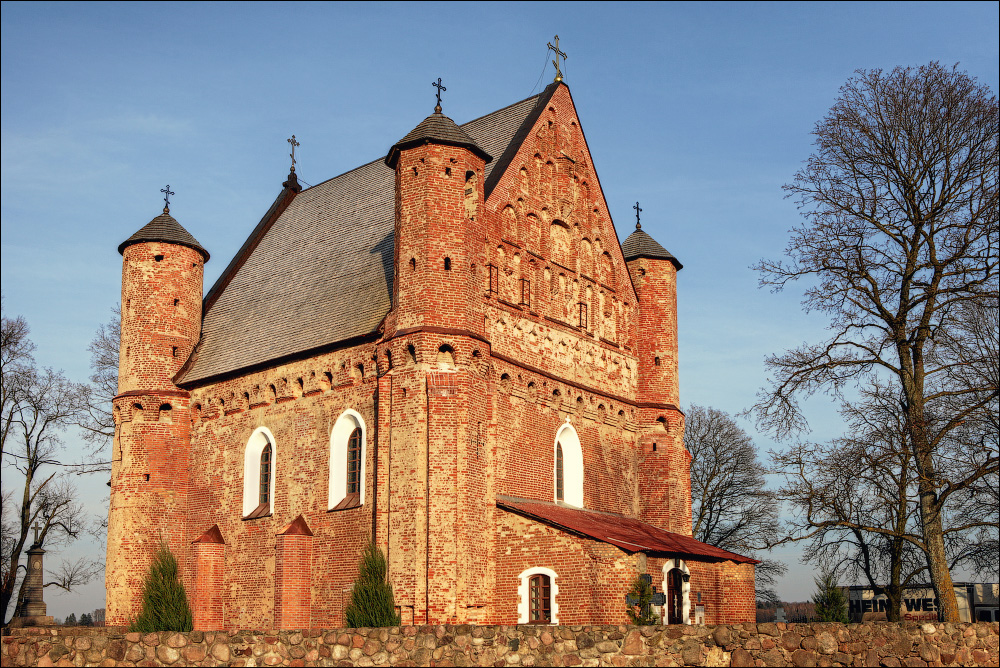
The 16th-century Church of St. Michael, Synkavichy

Belarusian Gothic, (Note: Belarusian: беларуская готыка, romanized: bełaruskaja hotyka) also known as Ruthenian Gothic, is the architectural style of ecclesiastical buildings and fortified structures of the 15th and 16th centuries in modern Belarus, Lithuania, eastern Poland and western Ukraine.

Although these buildings have features typical of Gothic architecture such as lofty towers, flying buttresses, pointed arches and vaulted ceilings, they also contain elements not typically considered Gothic by Central and Western European standards.

== Terminology ==
The term was introduced by Belarusian historian Mikoła Ščakacichin in his work "Essays from the history of Belarusian art" in 1920s. Initially supported by Belarusian historians, in 1960s-80s it gained recognition amongst some of the Russian and Lithuanian historians.

Depending on the area, it can also be referred to as Ukrainian and Lithuanian.

== History ==
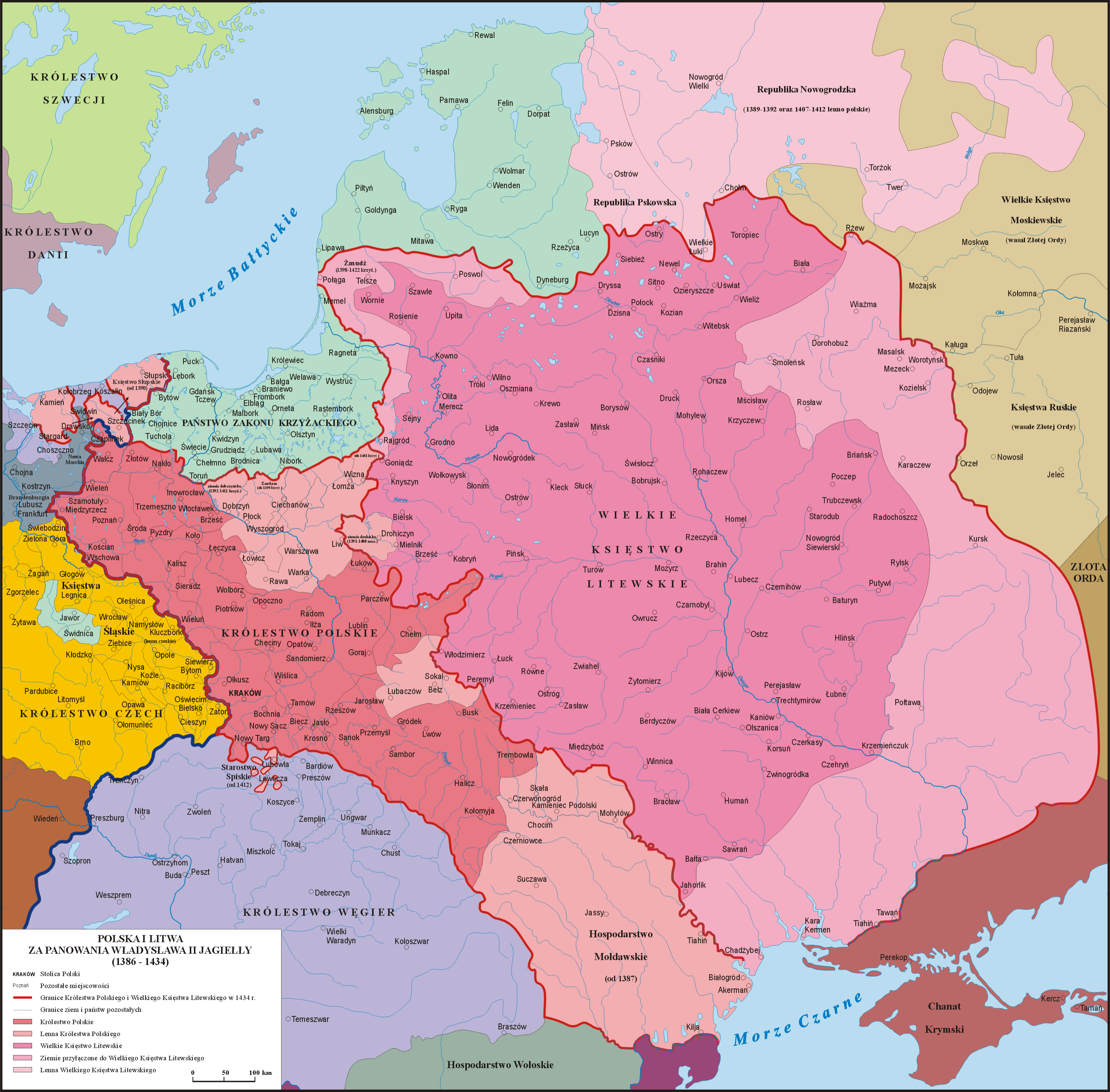
Grand Duchy of Lithuania and Kingdom of Poland in 1386–1434

With the baptism of the Grand Prince Vladimir the Great and the Christianization of the Kievan Rus', the region's architecture became heavily influenced by Byzantine architecture.

During the 13th century and start of 14th century, the Slavic principalities are eventually subjugated by the Grand Duchy of Lithuania, a pagan state which was fighting against the Teutonic Order's expansion. The Grand Duchy became a dominant power in the 14th century, featuring a developed Lithuanian nobility. Lithuanian rulers started building Brick Gothic castles and establishing Catholic churches, which were also constructed in Brick Gothic. Contacts with the Teutonic order and Europe allowed to hire experienced architects.

The Act of Krėva in 1386 caused the Christianization of Lithuania and increased communication in western and southern Europe. Christianization of Lithuania led to more intensive expansion of Western culture and namely, Gothic style into Orthodox lands.

During this period, the Gothic style came to the Slavic regions. In central and southern Europe however, it was already being displaced by Renaissance architecture.

In 1346 the Orthodox Cathedral of the Theotokos, Vilnius in Vilnius, was constructed, before the Lithuanian state had become Catholic. (see history of Roman Catholic Lithuania).

Examples

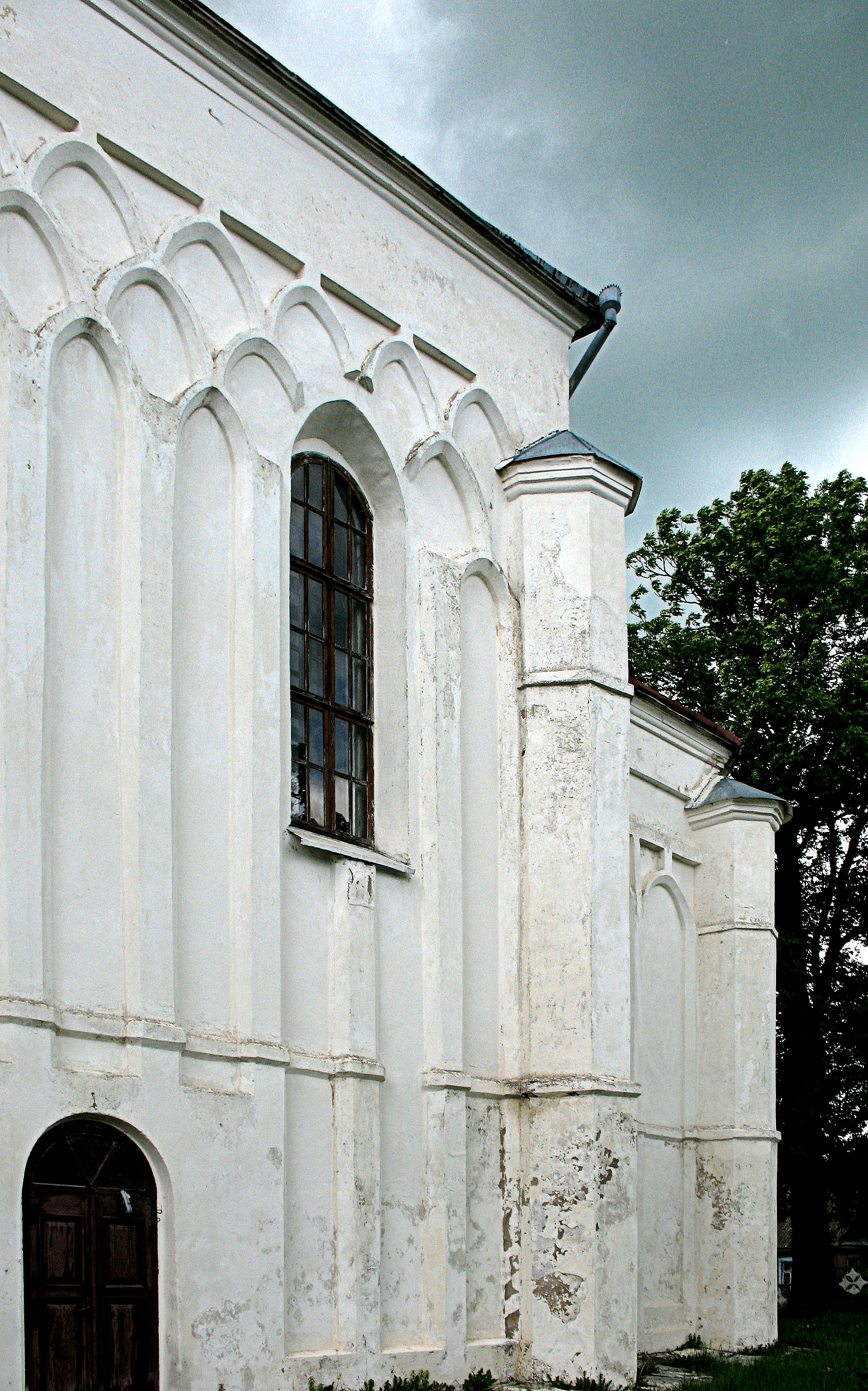
Cathedral of Ss. Boris and Gleb, Navahrudak (1519–1630), southern façade

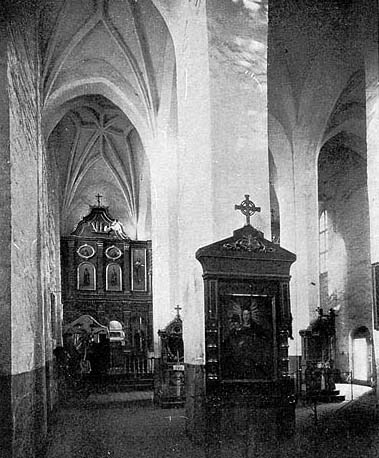
Ss. Boris and Gleb interior (1930 photo)

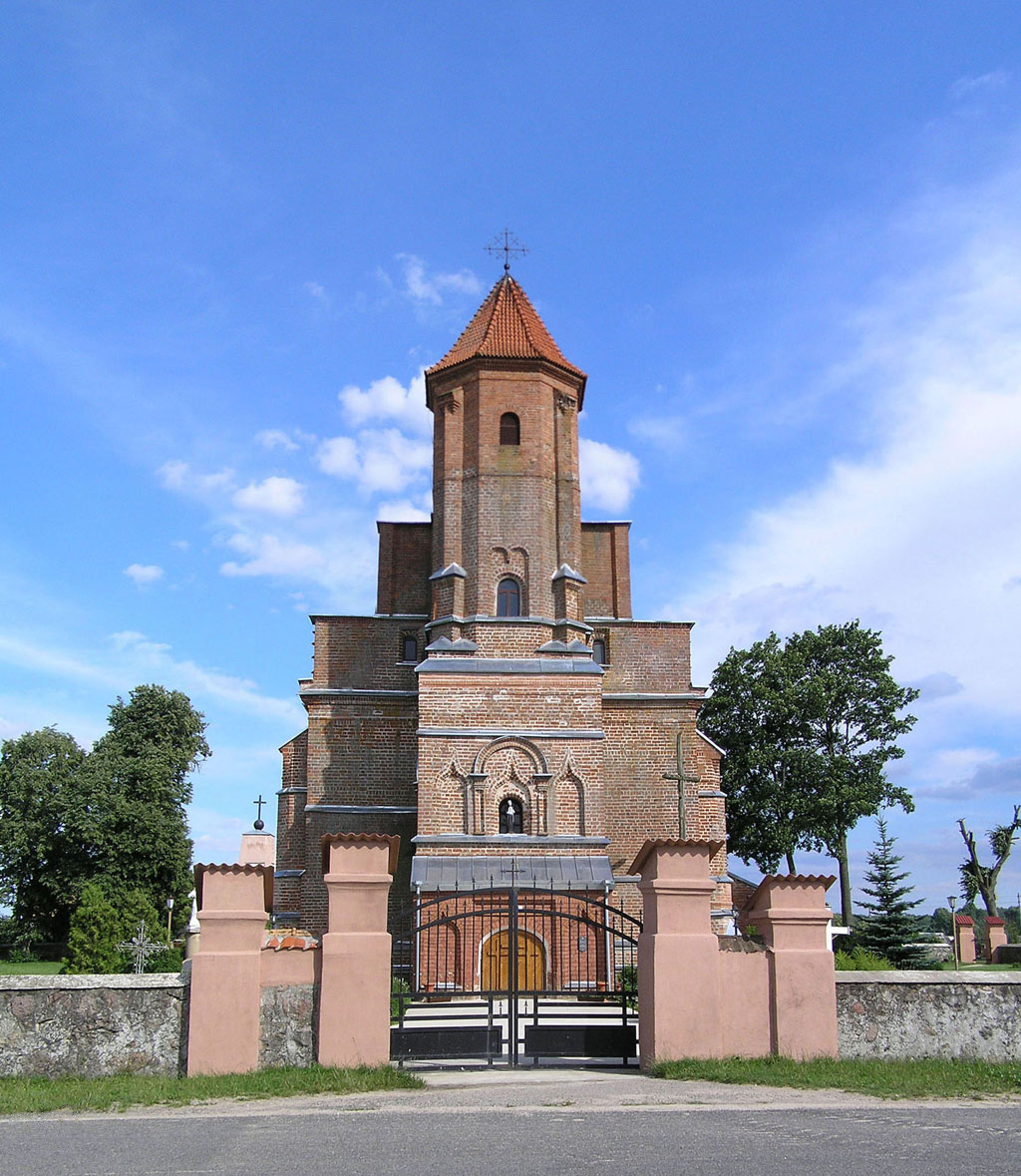
Church of Saint Michael, Hniezna, 1524–1527

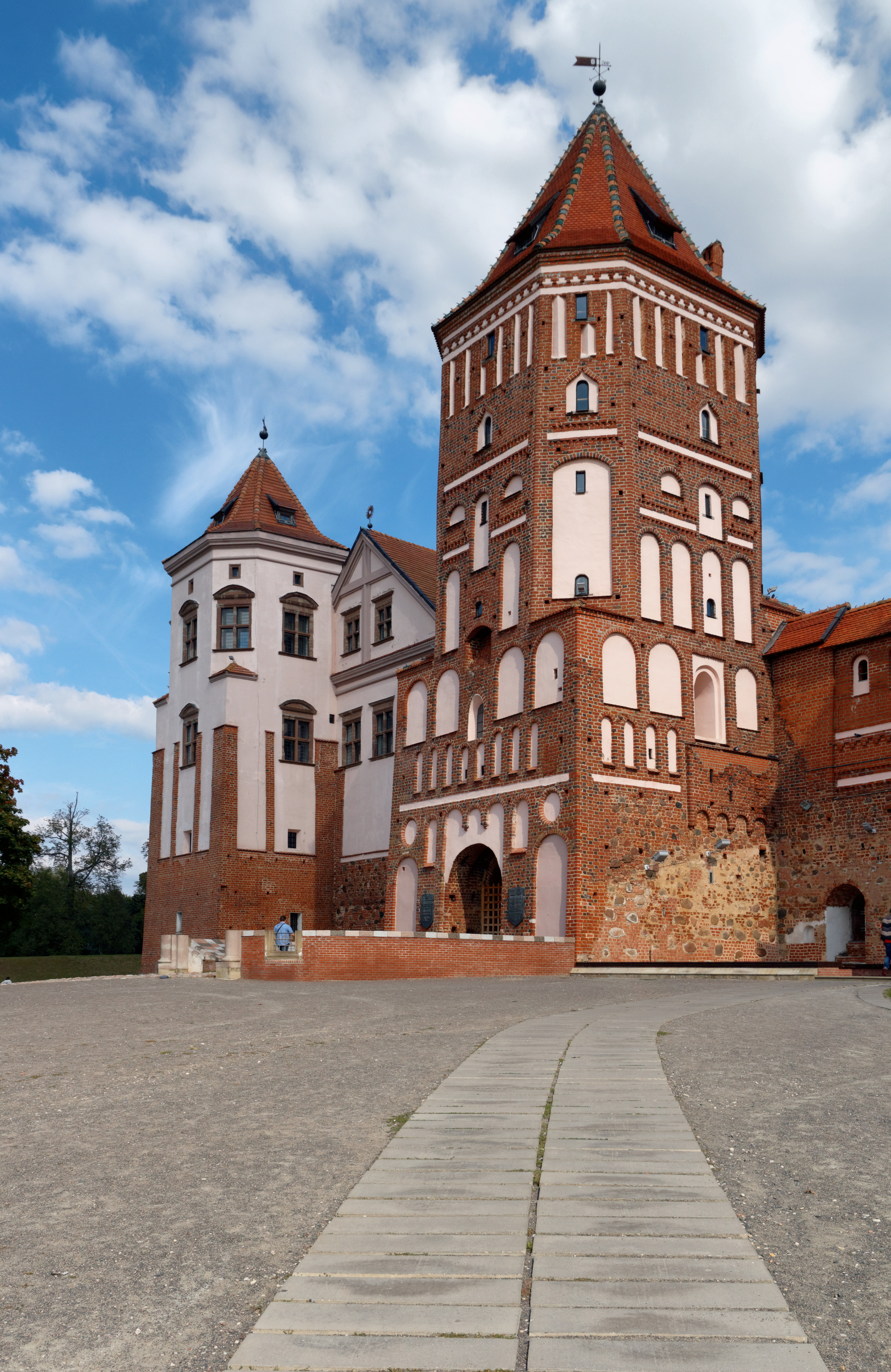
The 16th-century Mir Castle

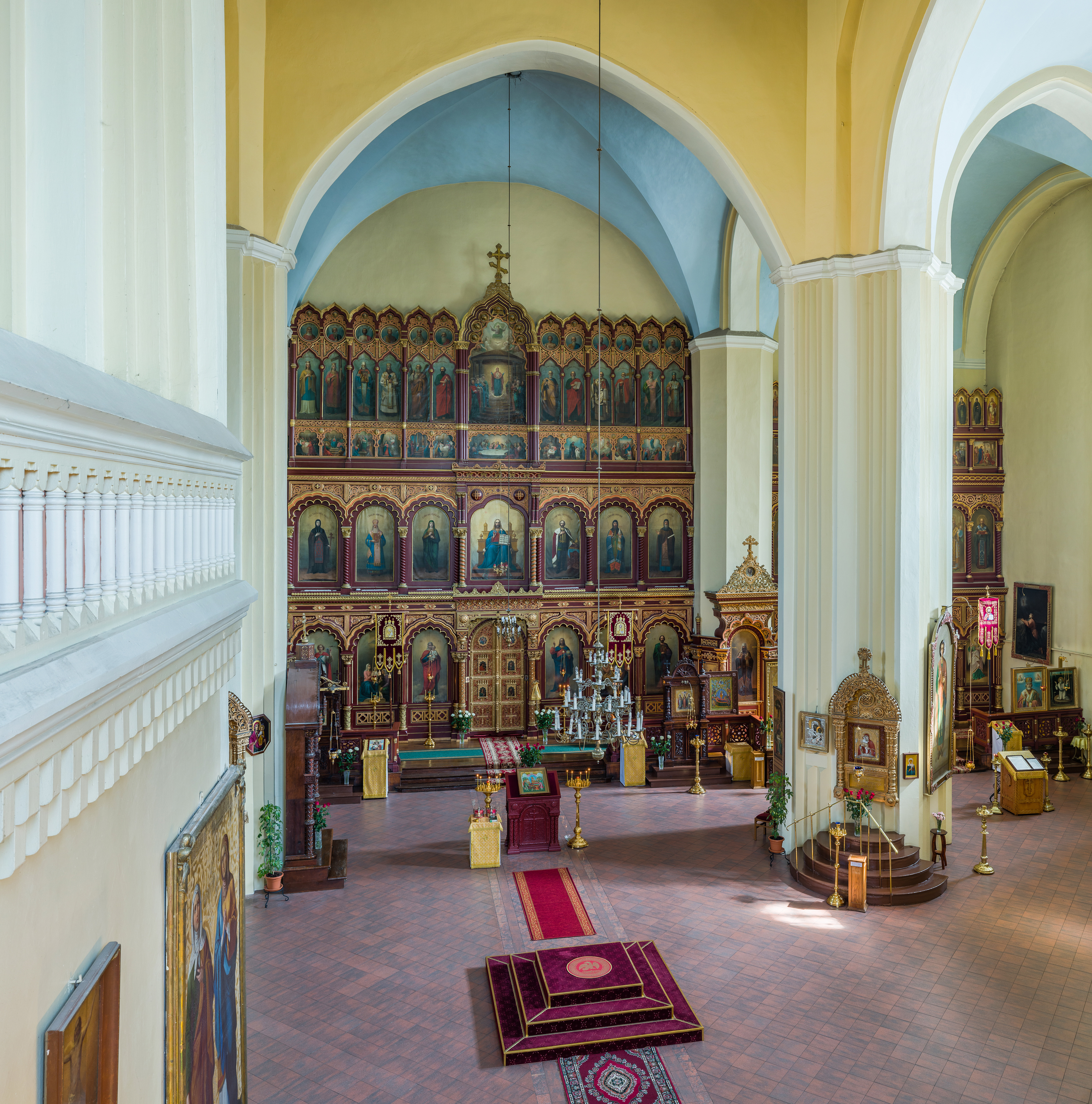
Cathedral of the Dormition of the Theotokos, Vilnius

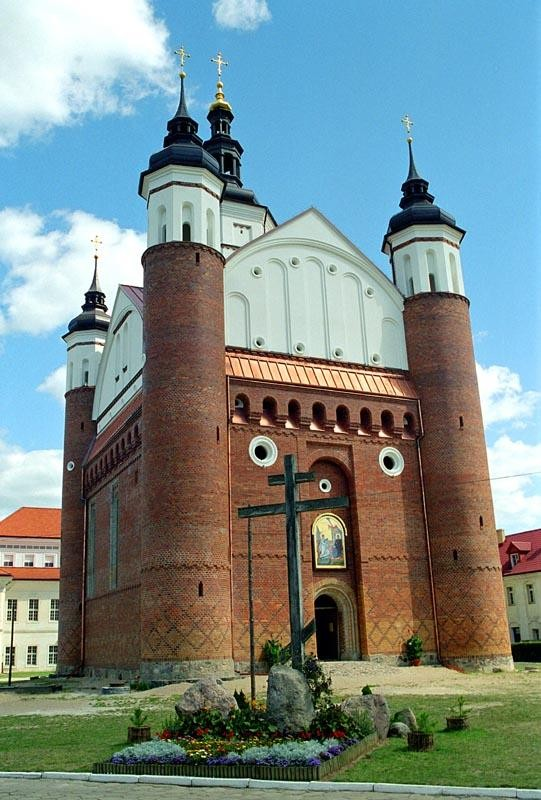
Church of Supraśl Orthodox Monastery, Poland

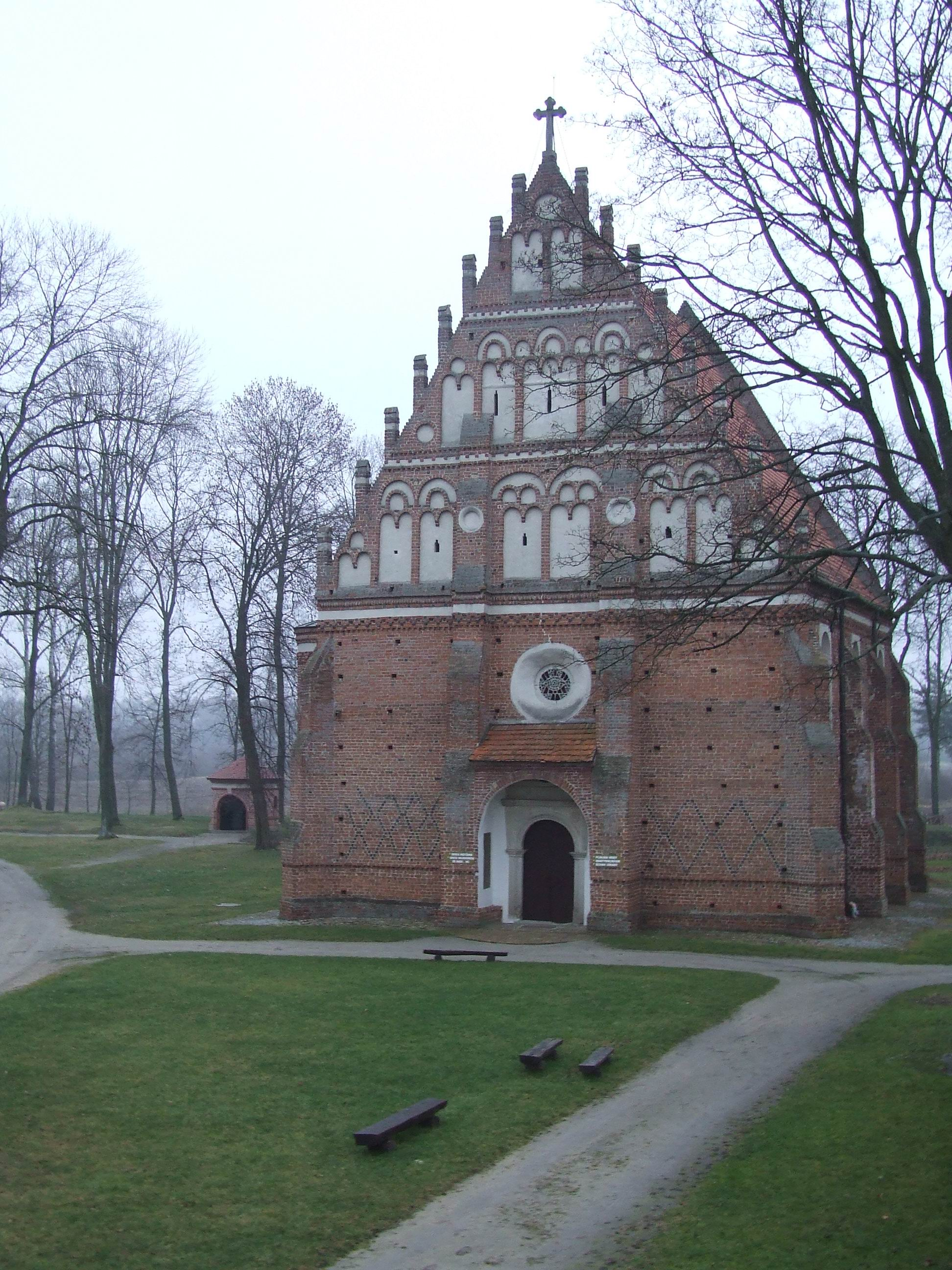
Church of the Holy Ghost (1530) in Kodeń, Poland, near the Bug River

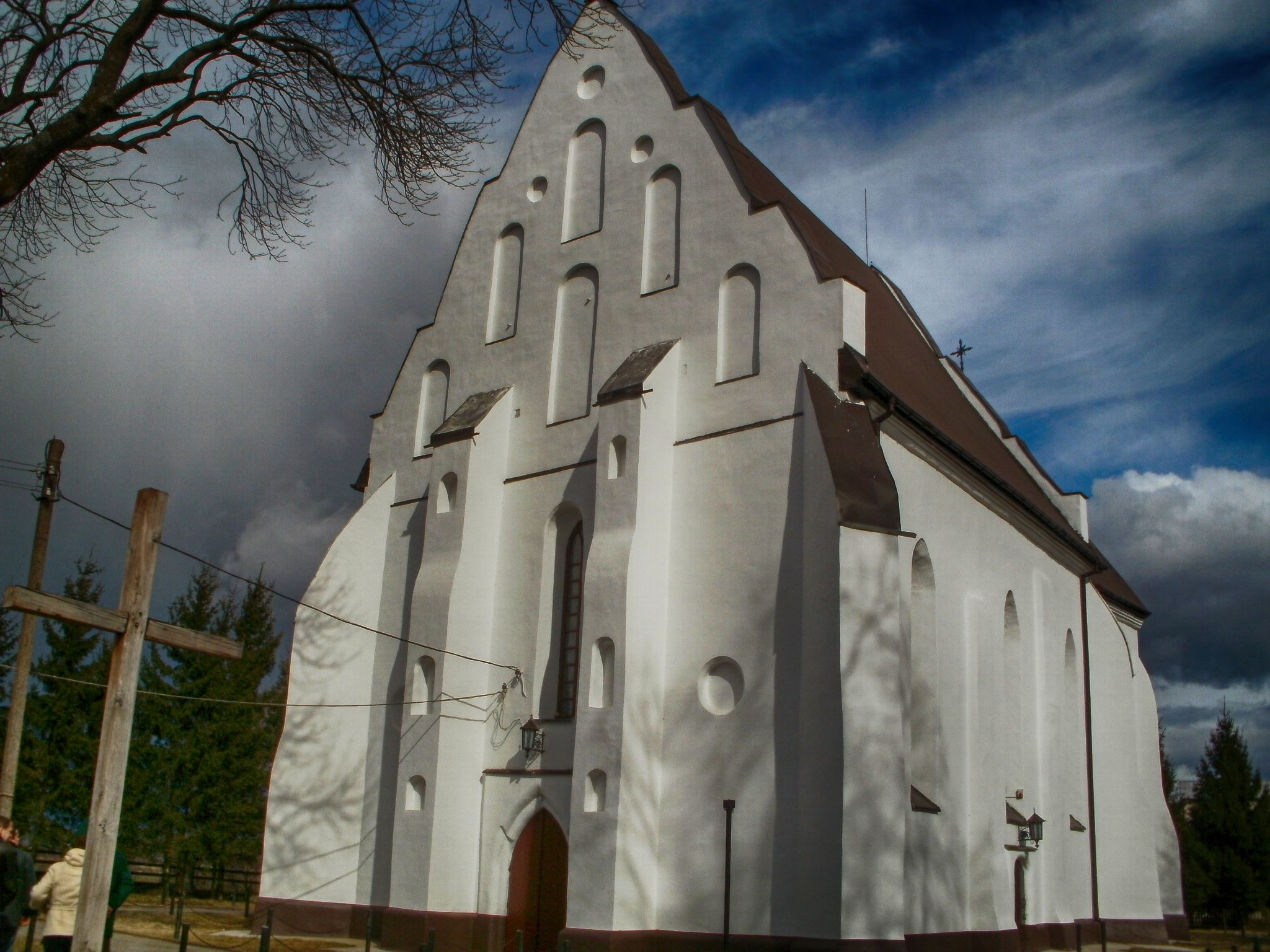
Church of Holy Trinity in Iškaldź

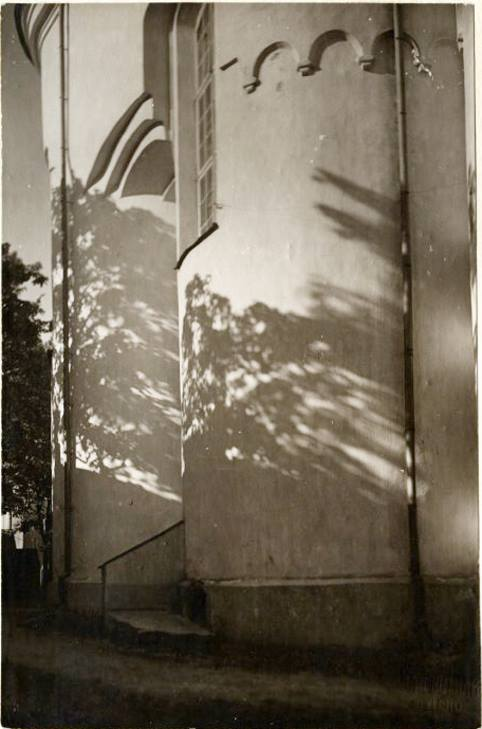
Greek Catholic Church of Holy Trinity in Vilnius

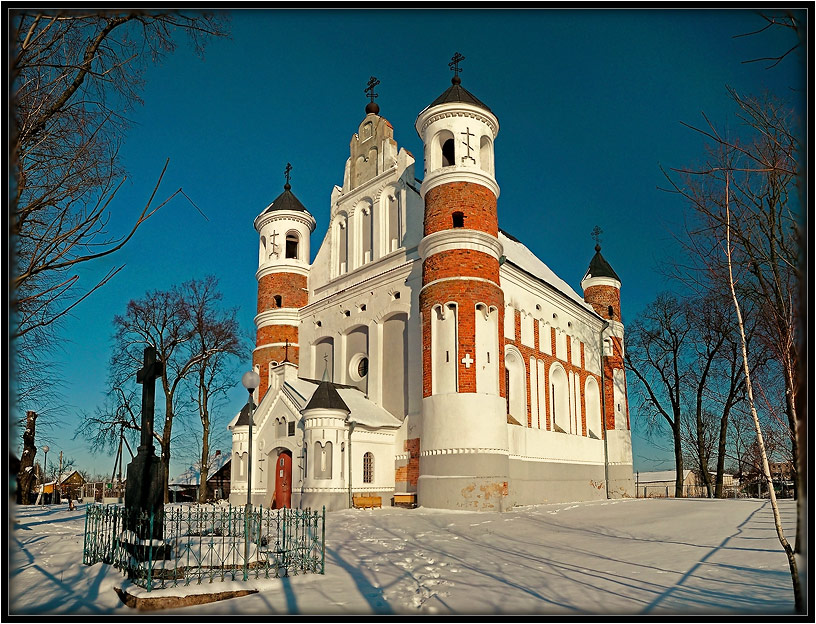
Church of the Nativity of the Blessed Virgin Mary in Muravanka

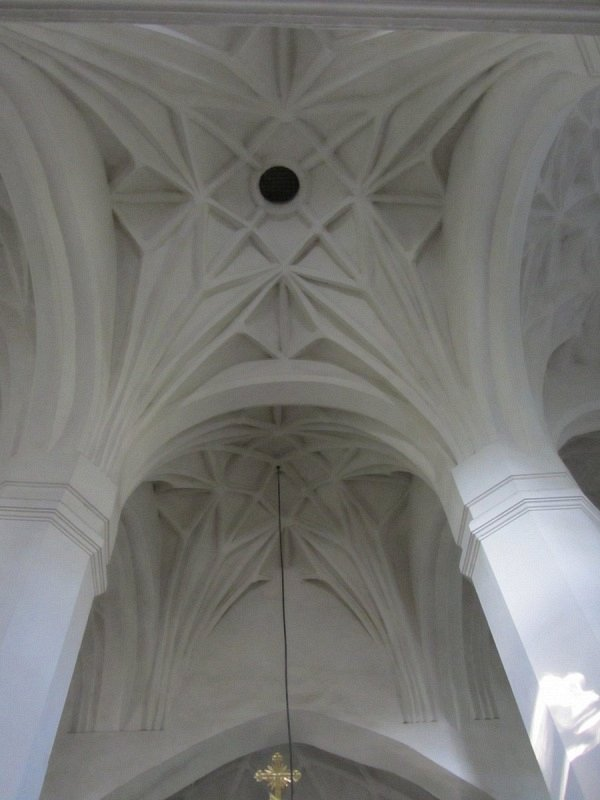
Church in Muravanka

== Architecture ==
Belarusian Gothic combines Byzantine, Gothic, and Renaissance architecture. Although some buildings have a north-German Brick Gothic design, others are plastered. Window arches are primarily pointed, but blind arcades and Lombard bands have round arches. Most churches have rib vaults, but there are also simple massive trunks such as those in Romanesque and Byzantine architecture. Most were fortified, with a short nave and a small tower at each corner; others have an ordinary, high, Western bell tower.

== Sources ==
- Nigel Roberts, Belarus, p. 185 (google books)
- Rainer Lindner, Historiker und Herrschaft: Nationsbildung und Geschichtspolitik in Weißrußland im 19. Und 20. Jahrhundert, Verlag Oldenbourg 1999, ISBN 3-486-56455-2, S. 256, II. Nation und Geschichte im Stalinismus → 3. Rivalität der Mythen (Nation-building and policy of history in Belarus in the 19th & 20th centuries) – in German
- Archives of Belarus, Church Architecture
- Беларуская готыка ў пабудове культавых будынкаў XV-XVI стст. – Belarusian Gothic in religious buildings of the 15th and 16th centuries (in Belarusian, very much illustrated)
