= Muravanka Church =

Eastern Orthodox church in Grodno Region, Belarus

Church of the Nativity of the Theotokos
- Царква Раства Багародзіцы
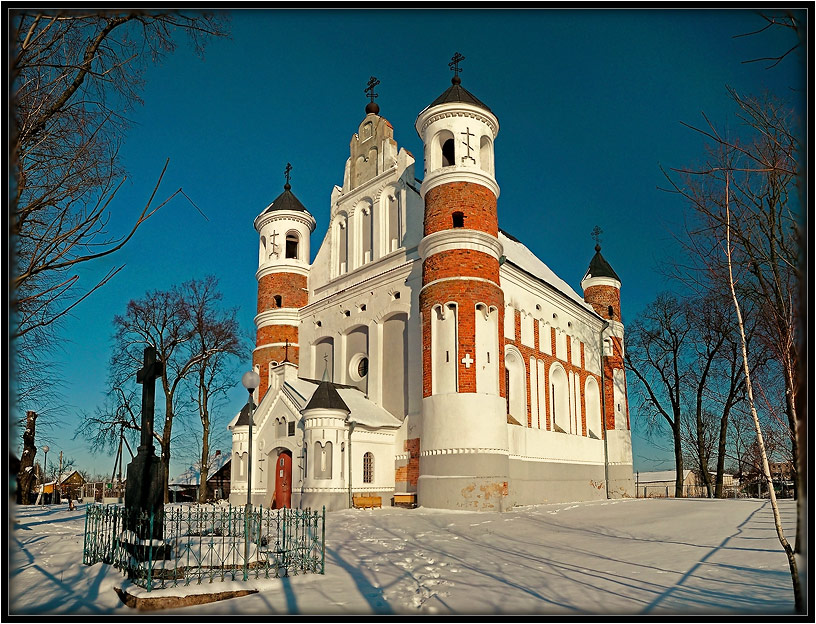
- Church of the Nativity of the Theotokos
- 53°41′51″N 24°59′59″E
- Location: Muravanka, Shchuchyn District, Grodno Region
- Country: Belarus
- Denomination: Eastern Orthodox

History
- Status: Parish church

Architecture
- Functional status: Active
- Completed: 1542

Specifications
- Length: 15
- Width: 13.5
- Height: 12
- Materials: Brick

Church of the Nativity of the God's Mother (Belarusian: Царква Раства Багародзіцы) is an Eastern Orthodox church in Muravanka, Shchuchyn District, Hrodna Province, in Belarus. It is an example of the Belarusian Gothic and one of the first fortified churches in the Grand Duchy of Lithuania along with the Church of St. Michael in Synkavichy.

== History ==
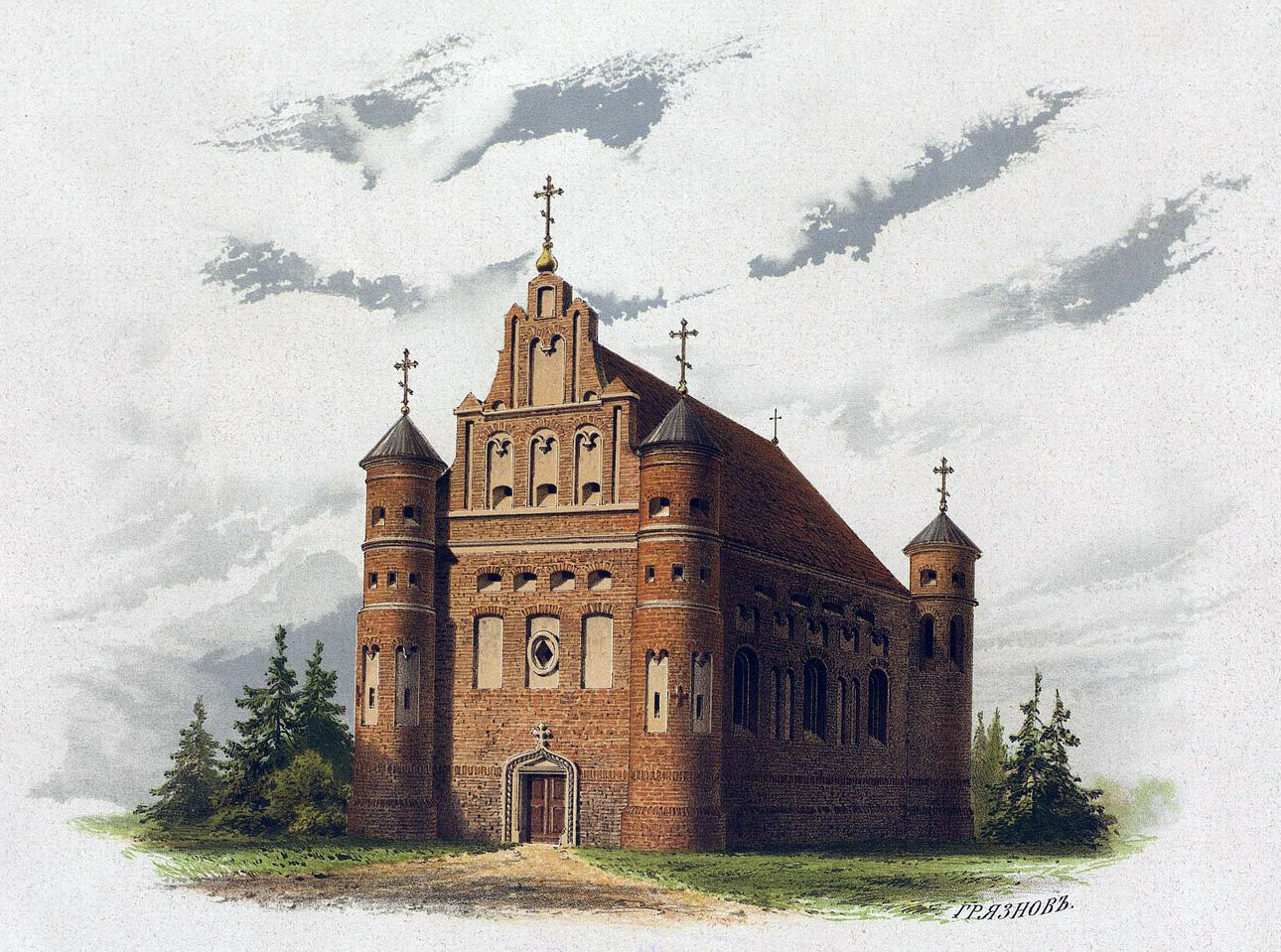
Muravanka church on a painting by Vyacheslav Gryaznov (1874)

The church in Muravanka arose in the first half of the 16th century. Church inspections made by the archeologists showed that it was probably built between years 1524 and 1542. The church was severely damaged in 1656 during the war against Russia and in 1706 during the Great Northern War. Then it was empty for many years and restored only in the middle of the 19th century. During World War I the German army used the space of the church as a warehouse for provisions. In the Interwar Poland it was turned into the Roman Catholic church. In 1990 the church was returned by the Soviet government to the Orthodox believers and has been in use since then.

== Architecture ==
The church in Muravanka is one of the finest examples of the fortified temple architecture of the former Grand Duchy of Lithuania. It has both traits of Gothic and Renaissance architecture.

The building is close to a square and sized 15x13.5 meters. There is a round tower on each of the corners. Diameter of the towers is about 4.5 meters and thickness of their walls is about 1.8 meters. On the eastern side of the church an apse is attached. The facades are covered with numerous ornament elements. The church has one entrance located on its western end. The columns support the vaults and the interior is split into the three naves about 12 meters each in height.

In spite of war damages and multiple restoration procedures, the outer look of the building is still close to the original project. Now it is protected by the law of the Republic of Belarus as a building that have nationwide cultural and historical value.

== World Heritage Status ==
This site was added to the UNESCO World Heritage Tentative List on 30 January 2004, in the Cultural category.

== Gallery ==
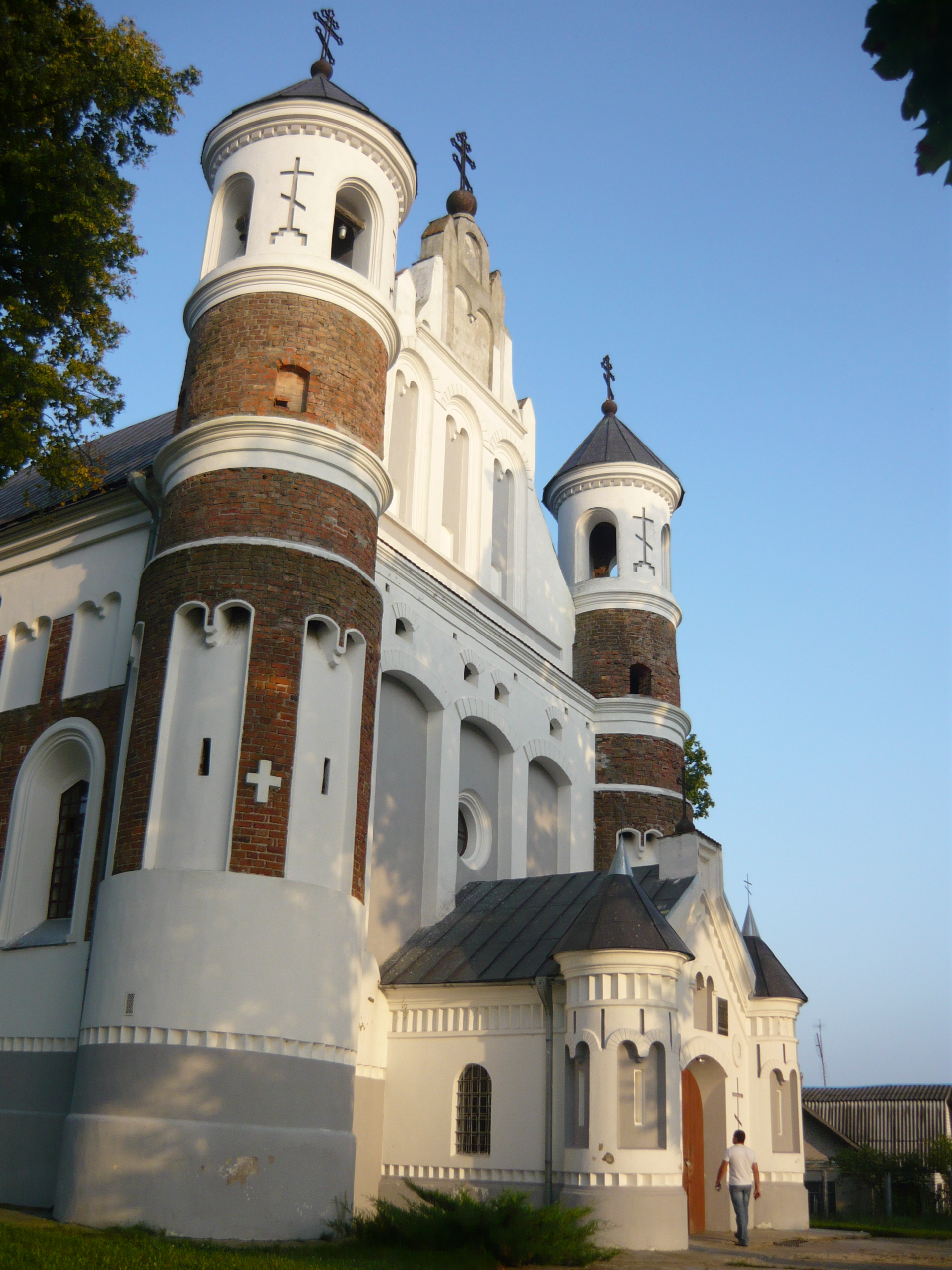

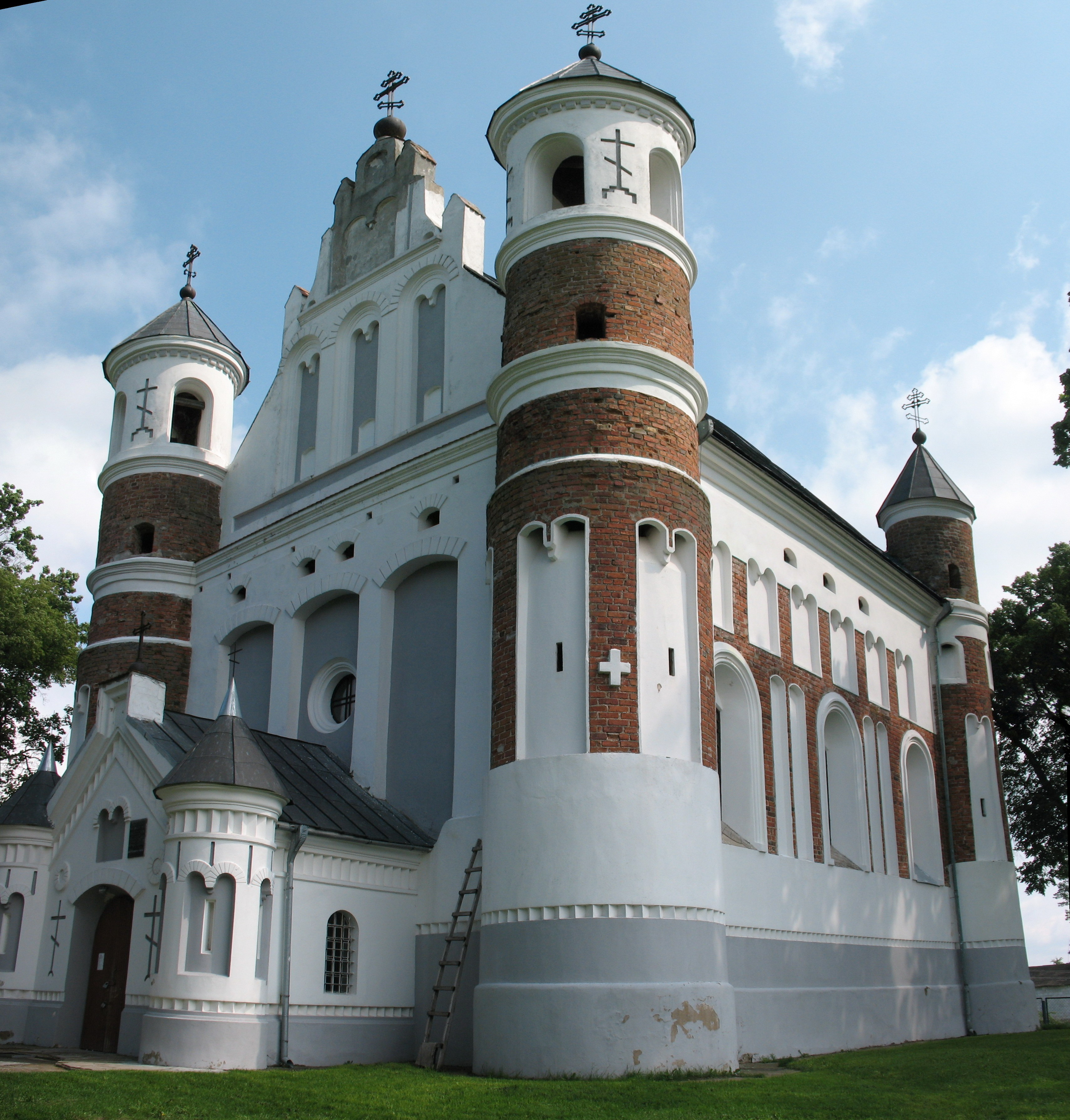

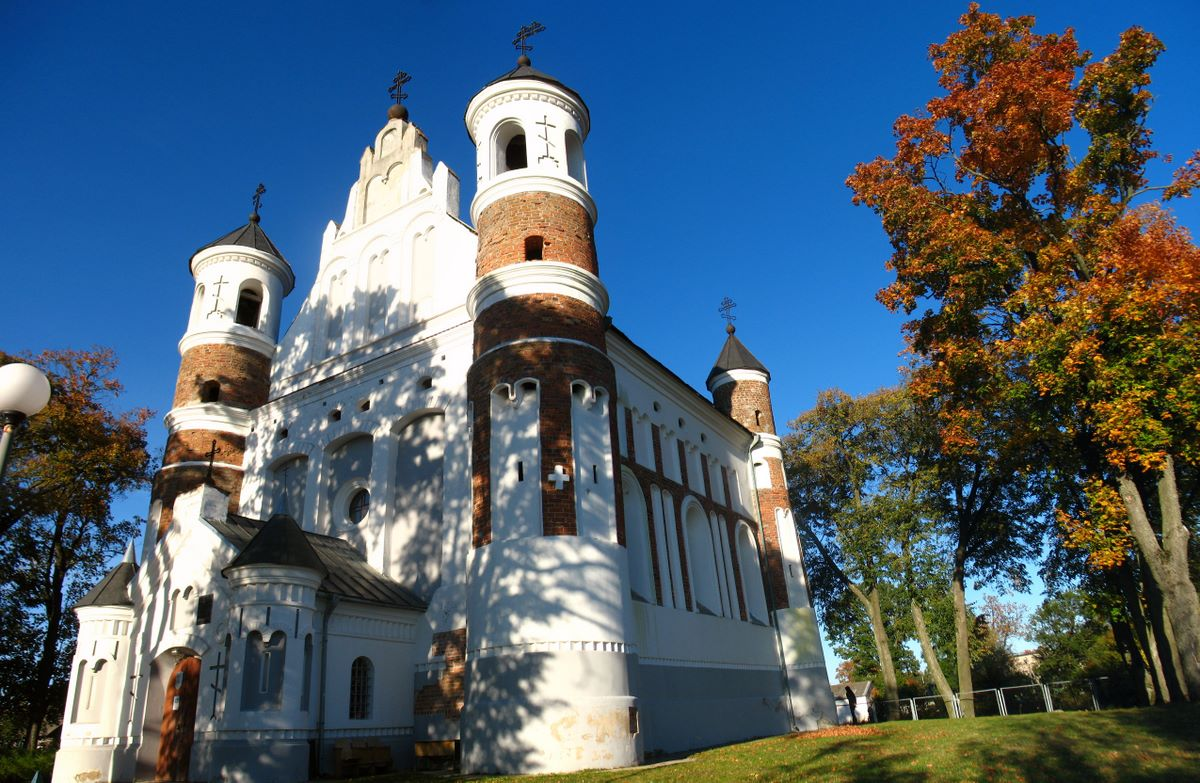

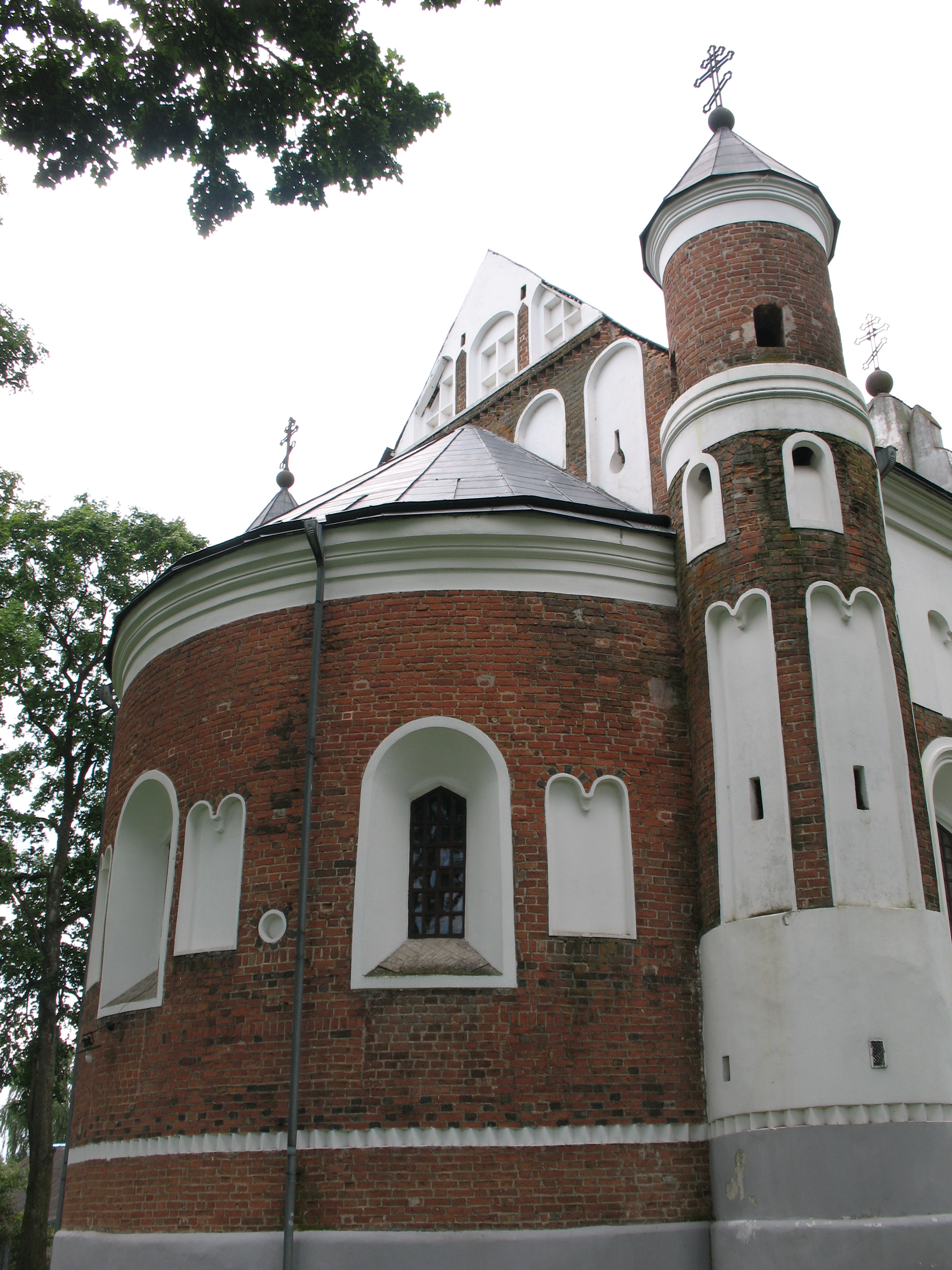

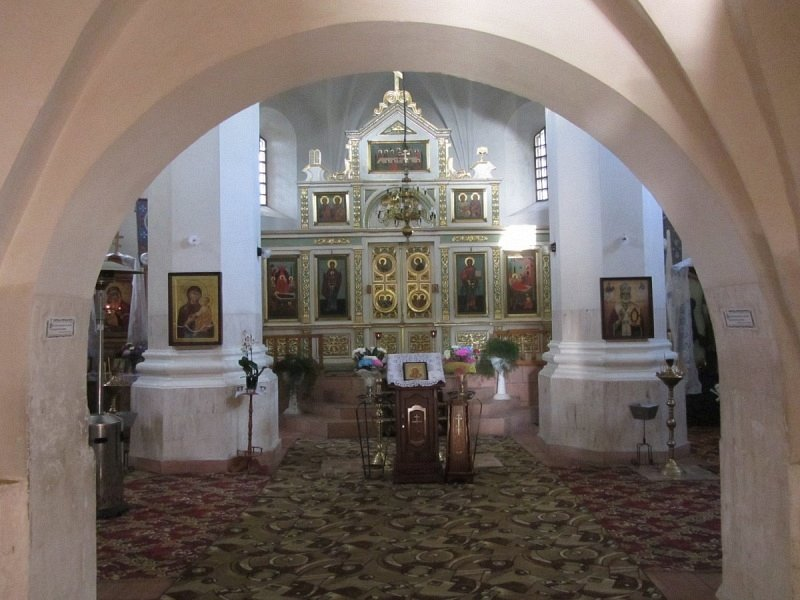

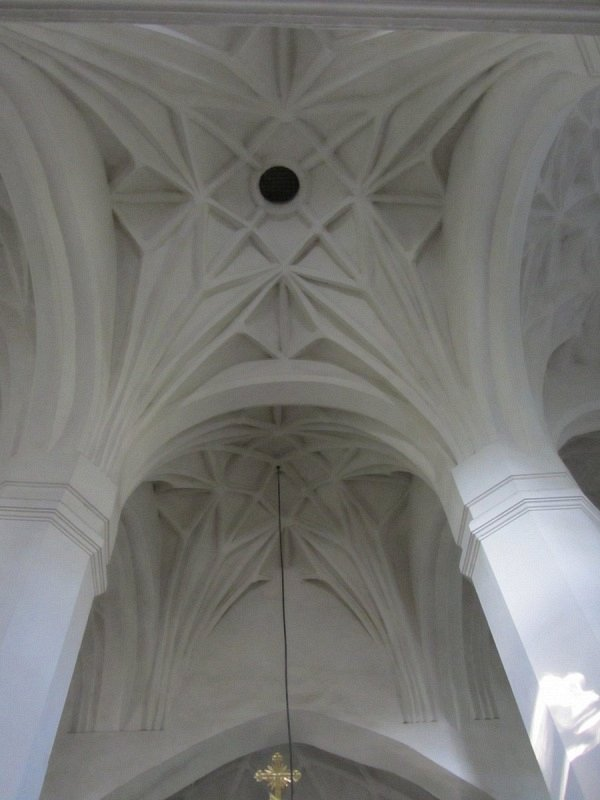
