= Synkavichy =

Village in Belarus

Synkavichy Сынкавічы (Belarusian) Сынковичи (Russian)
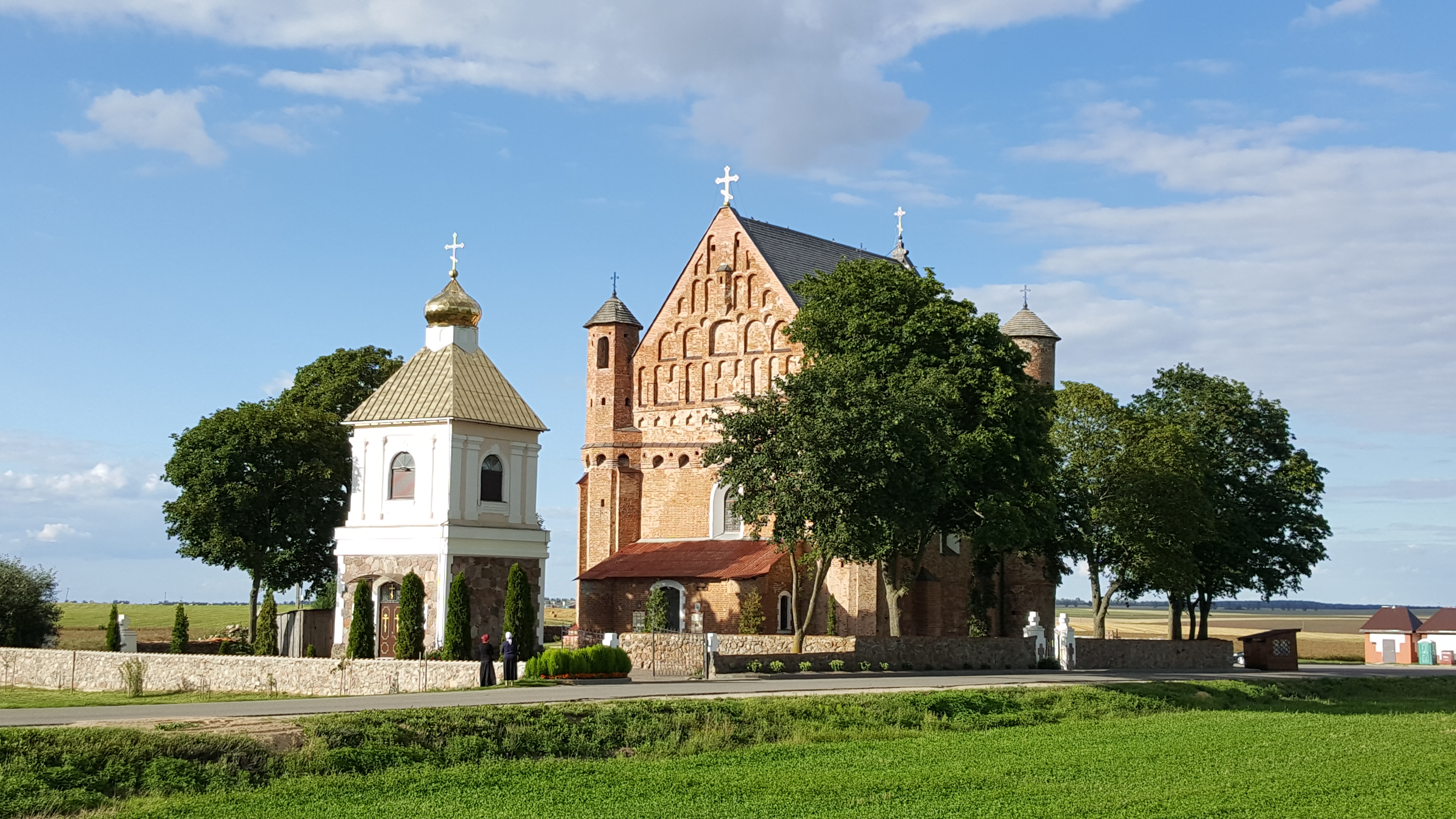
- Church of St. Michael

- Location within Belarus
- Coordinates: 53°07′11″N 25°09′16″E
- Country Subdivision: Belarus; Grodno Region

Population (2010)
  - Total: 34
- Time zone: UTC+3 (EET)
- Postal code: 231946
- Area code: +375 1564

Synkavichy, or Synkovichi (Belarusian: Сы́нкавічы; Russian: Сынковичи) is a village in Belarus. It is located in the Zelva District of Grodna Region.

The village is famous for its fortified church of Saint Michael.

== Name ==
Traditional name of the village is Synkóvichy, but it was changed in 1960s due to Russification.

== History ==
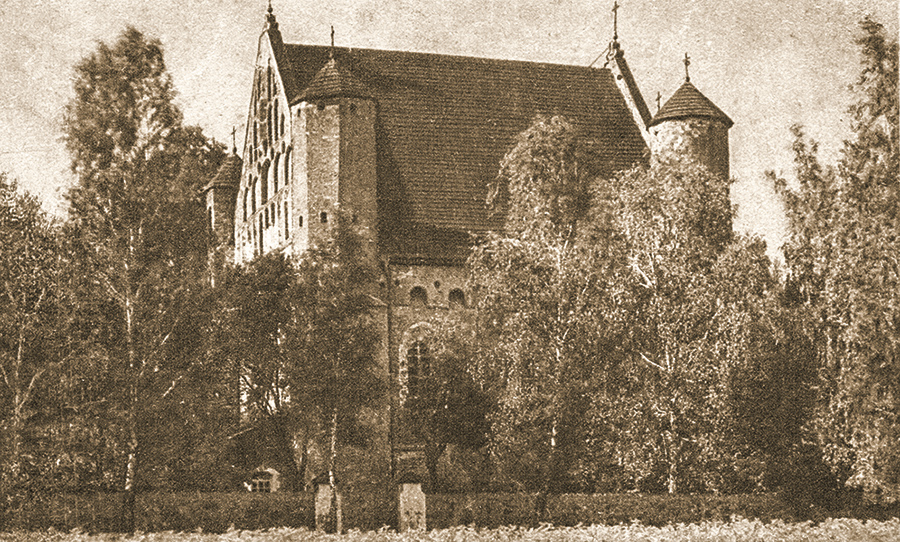
Church of St. Michael in the interwar period

The village is mentioned for the first time in connection with the church of St. Michael so it was founded roughly at the end of the 15th or at the beginning of the 16th century. Some scholars still think that the early 15th century is more probable. In that case the village was founded in the times of Vytautas.

Until the partitions of the Polish-Lithuanian Commonwealth Synkavichy was a part of the Grand Duchy of Lithuania. Then it became a part of the Russian Empire and stayed there until the World War I. Between wars it ended up in the Second Polish Republic, within which it was administratively located in the Słonim County in the Nowogródek Voivodeship. In the 1921 census, the entire population declared Polish nationality.

Following the joint German-Soviet invasion of Poland, which started World War II in September 1939, the town was first occupied by the Soviet Union until 1941, then by Nazi Germany until 1944, and re-occupied by the Soviet Union afterwards, within which it was included into Zielva District, Belarusian SSR, now Belarus.
