= Church of St. Michael, Synkavichy =

Eastern Orthodox church in Synkavichy, Belarus

Church of Saint Michael
- Царква Святога Міхаіла
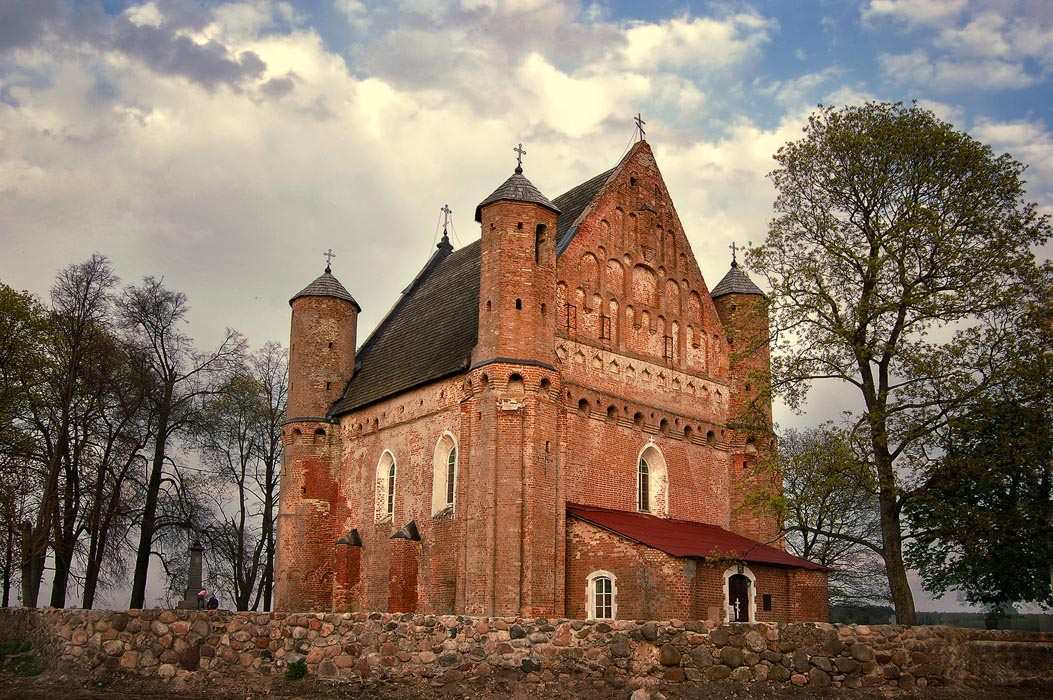
- Church of Saint Michael
- 53°07′23″N 25°09′26″E
- Location: Synkavichy, Zelva District, Grodno Region
- Country: Belarus
- Denomination: Eastern Orthodox

History
- Status: Parish church
- Consecrated: 1407

Architecture
- Functional status: Active
- Completed: The middle of the 16th century

Specifications
- Length: 17.5
- Width: 13
- Materials: Brick

The Church of St. Michael (Belarusian: Царква Святога Міхаіла) is an Eastern Orthodox church on the northern outskirts of the village of Synkavichy, Zelva District, Hrodna Province, in Belarus. It is an example of the Belarusian Gothic and one of the first fortified churches in the Grand Duchy of Lithuania along with the Church of the Nativity of the Blessed Virgin Mary in Muravanka.

== History ==
=== Foundation ===
Some sources assume that the church was founded by Konstanty Ostrogski, who reconstructed similar church in Vilnius in 1511–1522. More recent research considers the construction year to be 1407. In 2018 assistant professor Gennady Lavretsky found that the church's graffiti was created in the 1320s, proving even older construction date. According to the legend, the church was built by Vytautas, Grand Duke of Lithuania, in honour of his escape from his cousin, Jogaila, when they were at war. Lavretsky assumes that it was rebuilt from the semi-destroyed castle where Vytautas took shelter. In fact the construction of the church bears much resemblance to a defensive facility.

=== Reconstruction ===
By 1837 the church was in decay. In 1880–1881, the temple was significantly reconstructed thanks to the efforts of the local priest Efstafy Mikhailovsky. Mikhailovsky conducted research on church history and heritage. He raised donations for restoration and wrote reports to different commissions explaining the historical and cultural value of the temple. In 1886-1887 he managed to persuade the Imperial Archeological Commission to grant more than four thousand roubles for the restoration. By 1890 all the works were done.

After the Union of Brest, the church became subordinate to the Holy See. After Polish-Lithuanian Commonwealth was partitioned the parish stayed active, but after November Uprising the church was converted into the Eastern Orthodox.

In 1926 was rebuilt as a Catholic church by the government of the Second Polish Republic. In 1988–1990, it was turned into the Orthodox again.

== Architecture ==
The church is an example of the Belarusian Gothic architecture. Its internal space is divided into the three naves supported by four pillars. The plan of the building is close to a square and has three apses on the east side. The walls are one and a half meters thick.

There are four defence towers on the corners of the church. The upper part of the western towers is made in the shape of octagon with three levels of arrowslits. Two eastern towers are cylindrical and also have arrowslits in the upper part.

The pediment has a number of niches varying in depth and size.

== World Heritage Status ==
This site was added to the UNESCO World Heritage Tentative List on January 30, 2004, in the Cultural category.

== Gallery ==
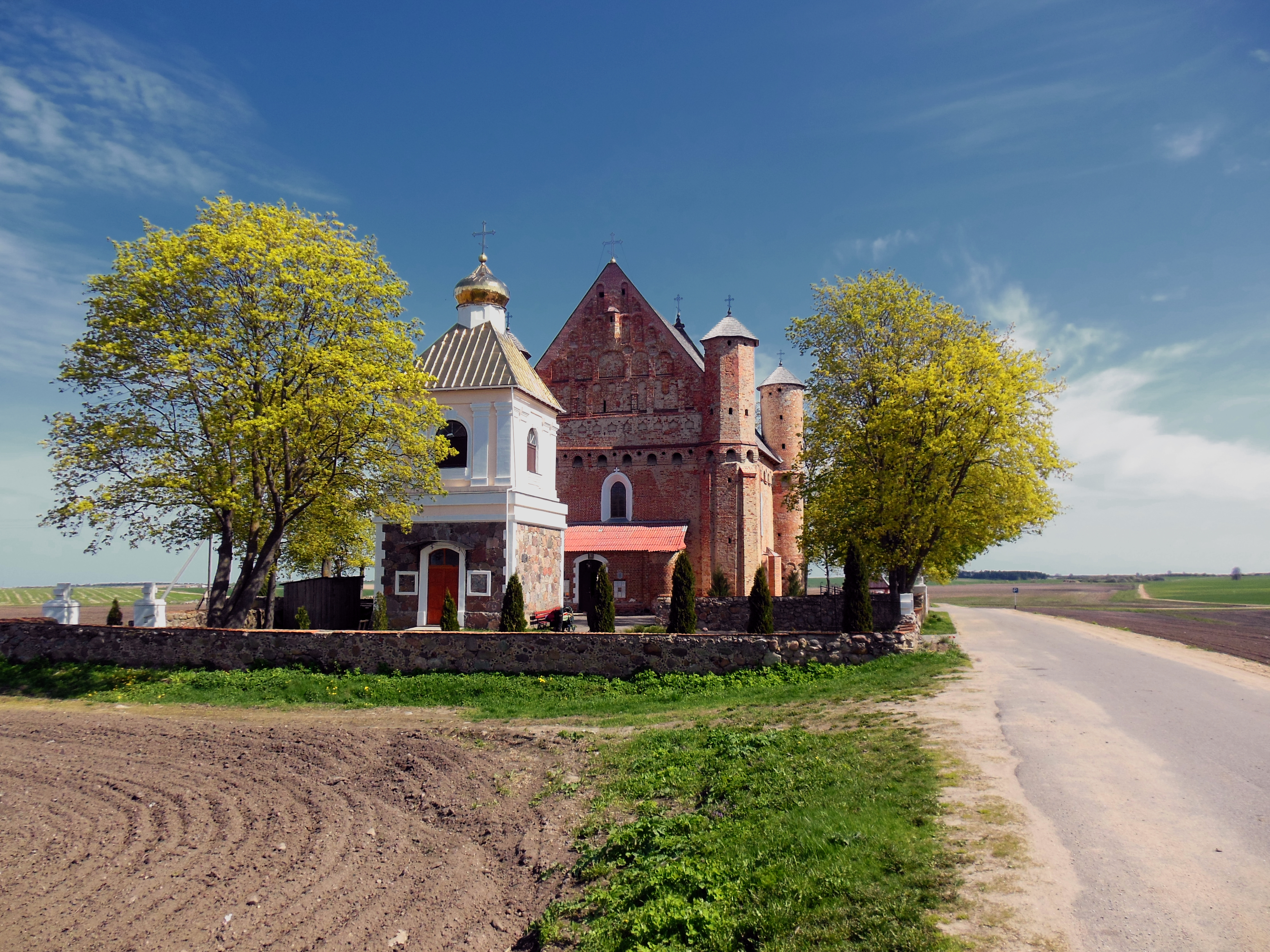
Landscape

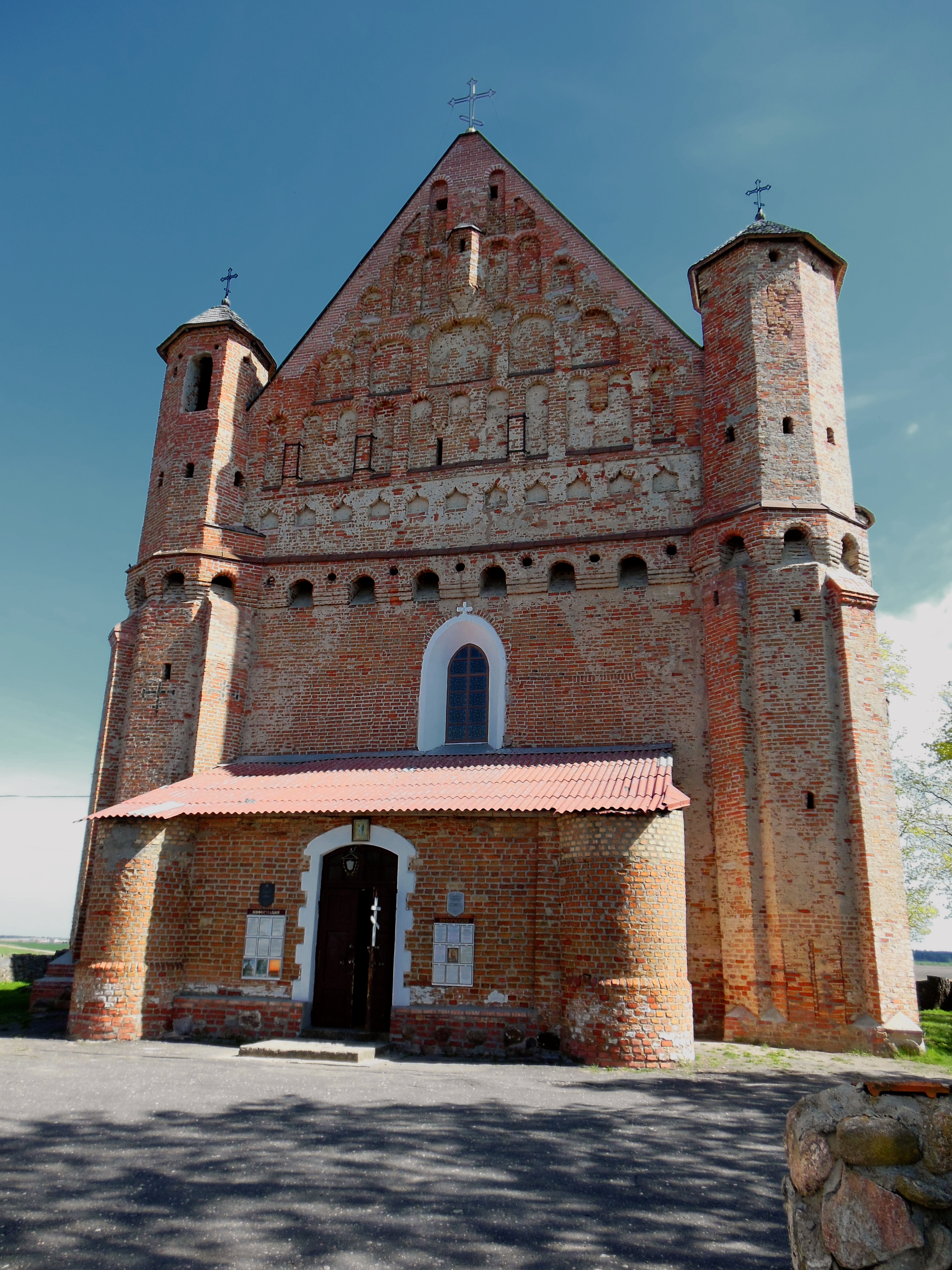
Front

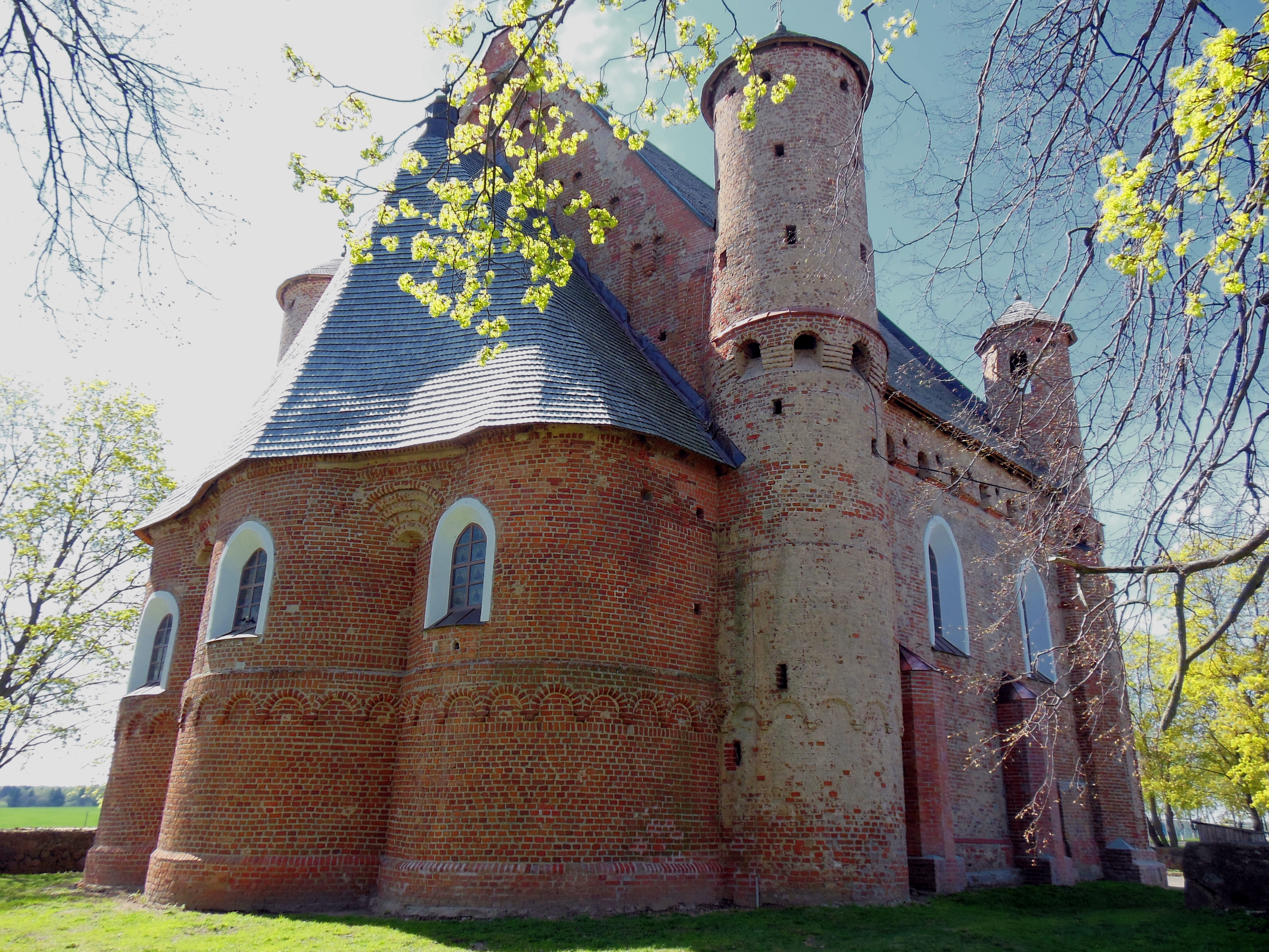
Back

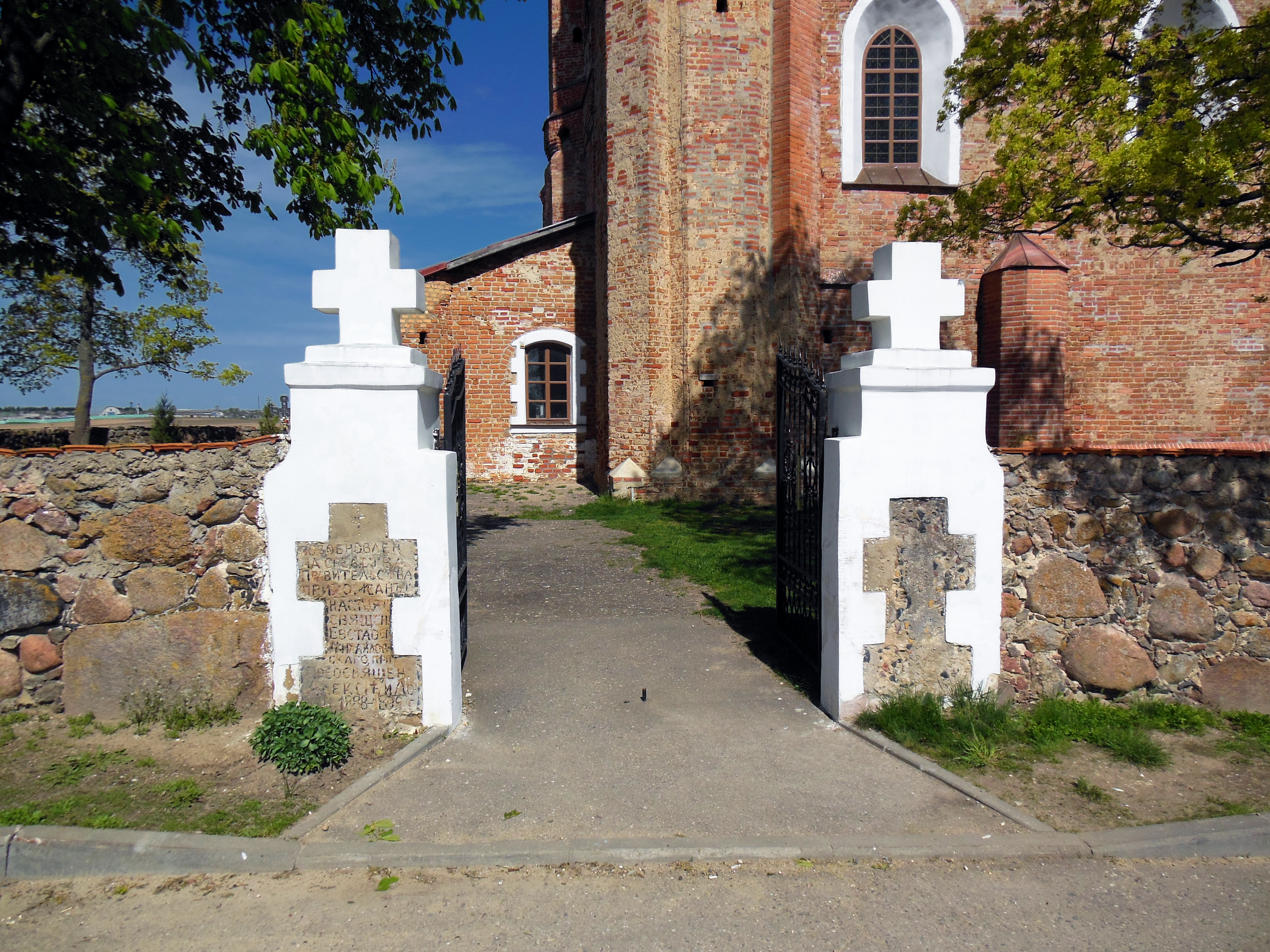
Gates

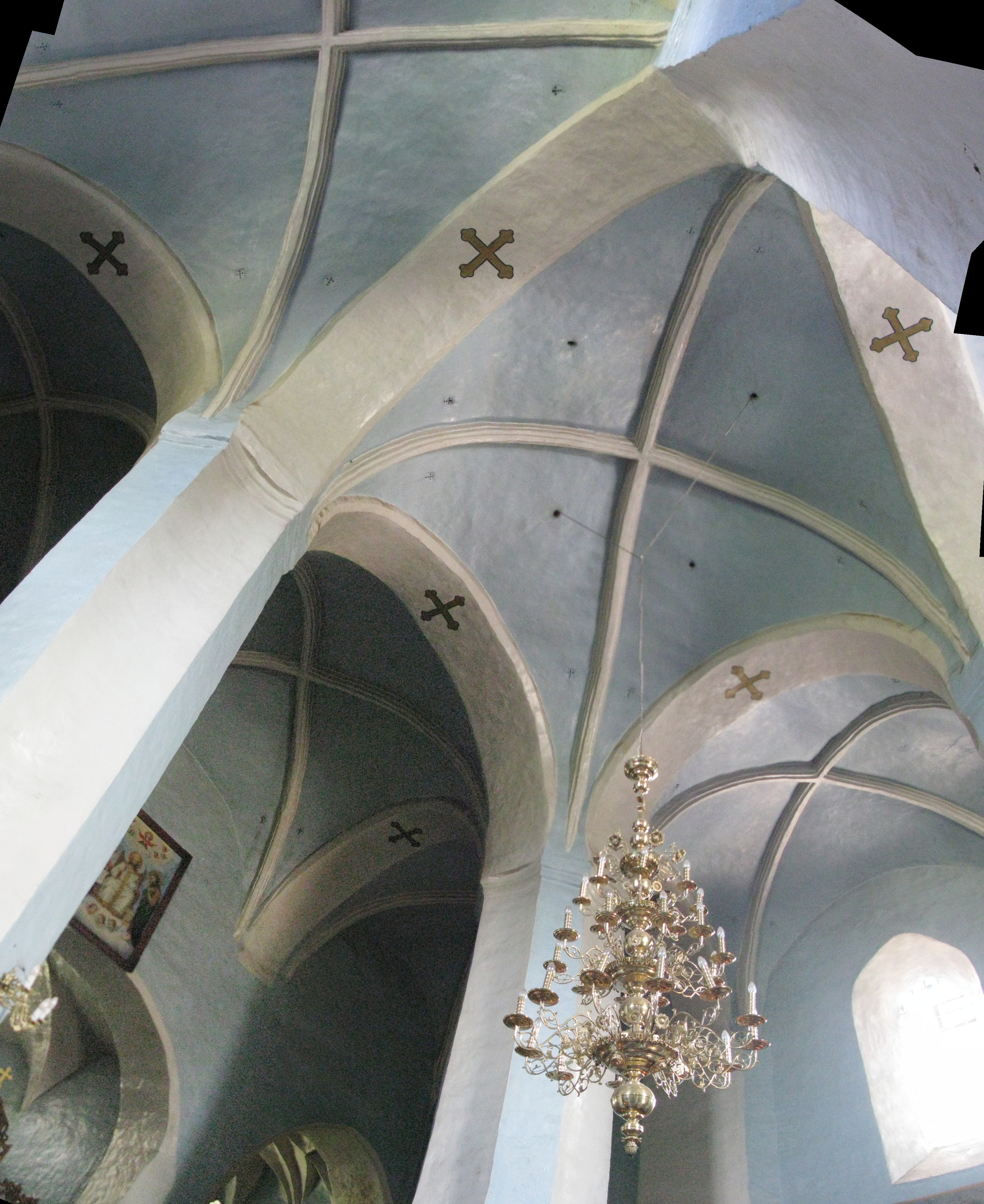
Interior

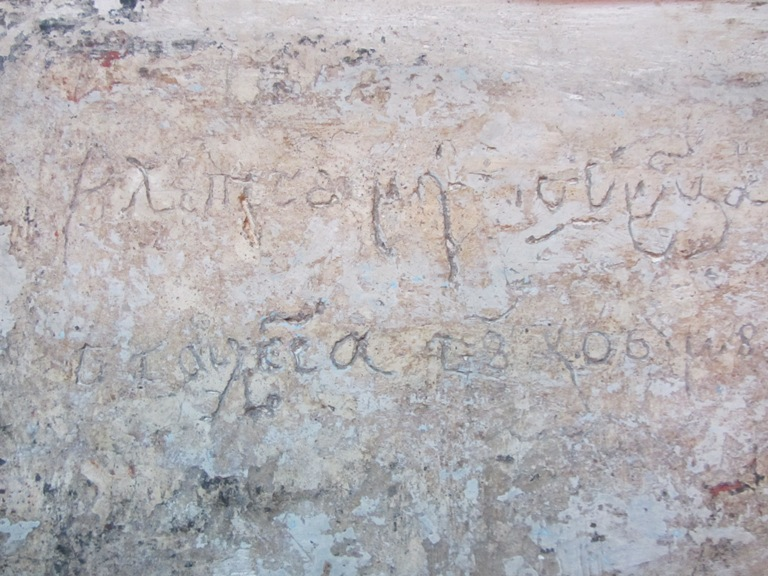
Old inscriptions

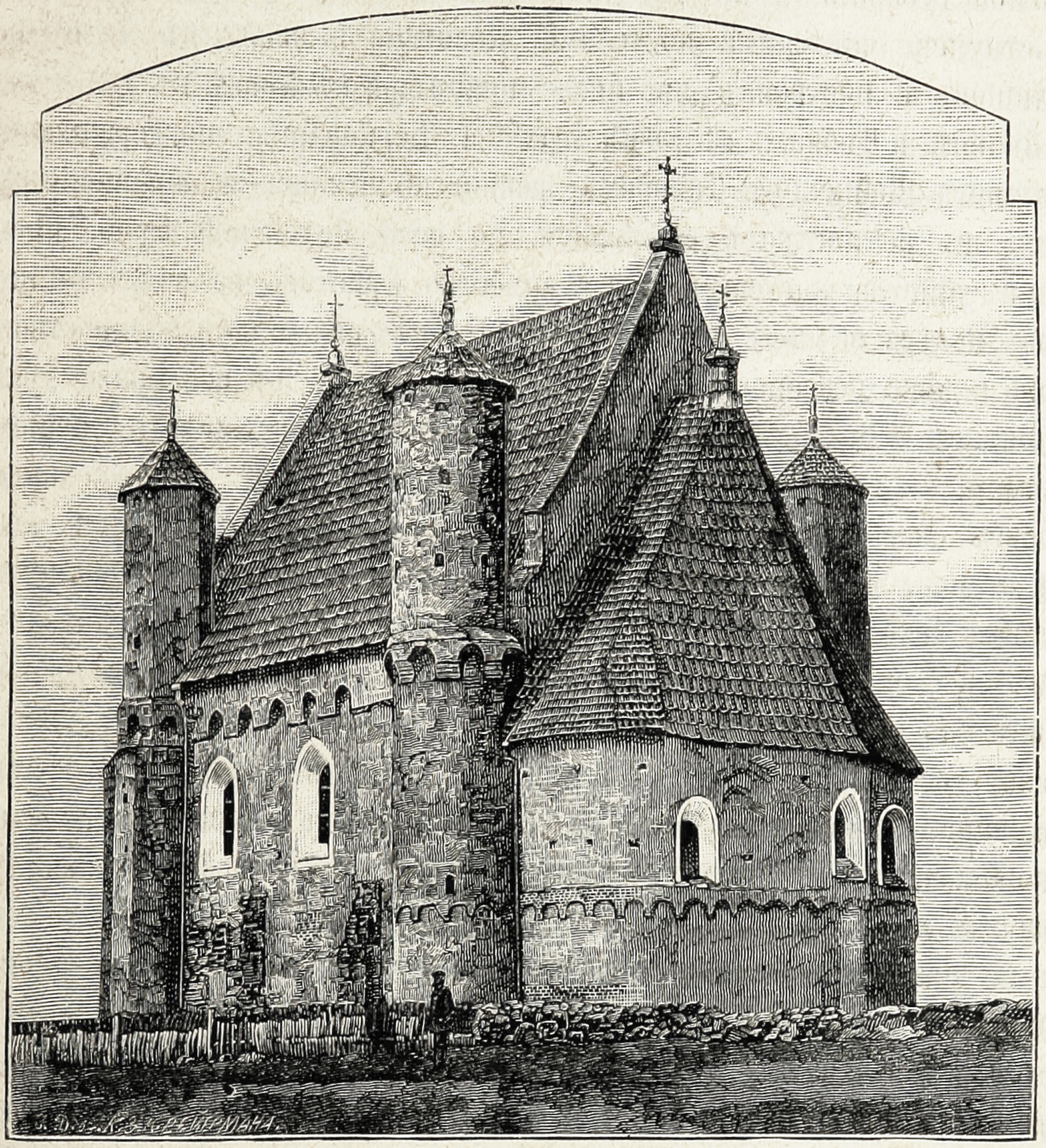
Architectural sketch from 1890 by Vasiliy Griaznov

== Sources ==
- Bubnov, Pavel (2017). Вклад протоиерея Евстафия Михайловского в сохранение Сынковичского храма [The Contribution of Priest Efstafy Mikhailovsky to Preservation of Church of Saint Archangel Michael in Synkovichi]. Chronos (5): 30–43.
