= Hniezna =

Agrotown in Grodno Region, Belarus

Hniezna Гнезна
- Agrotown
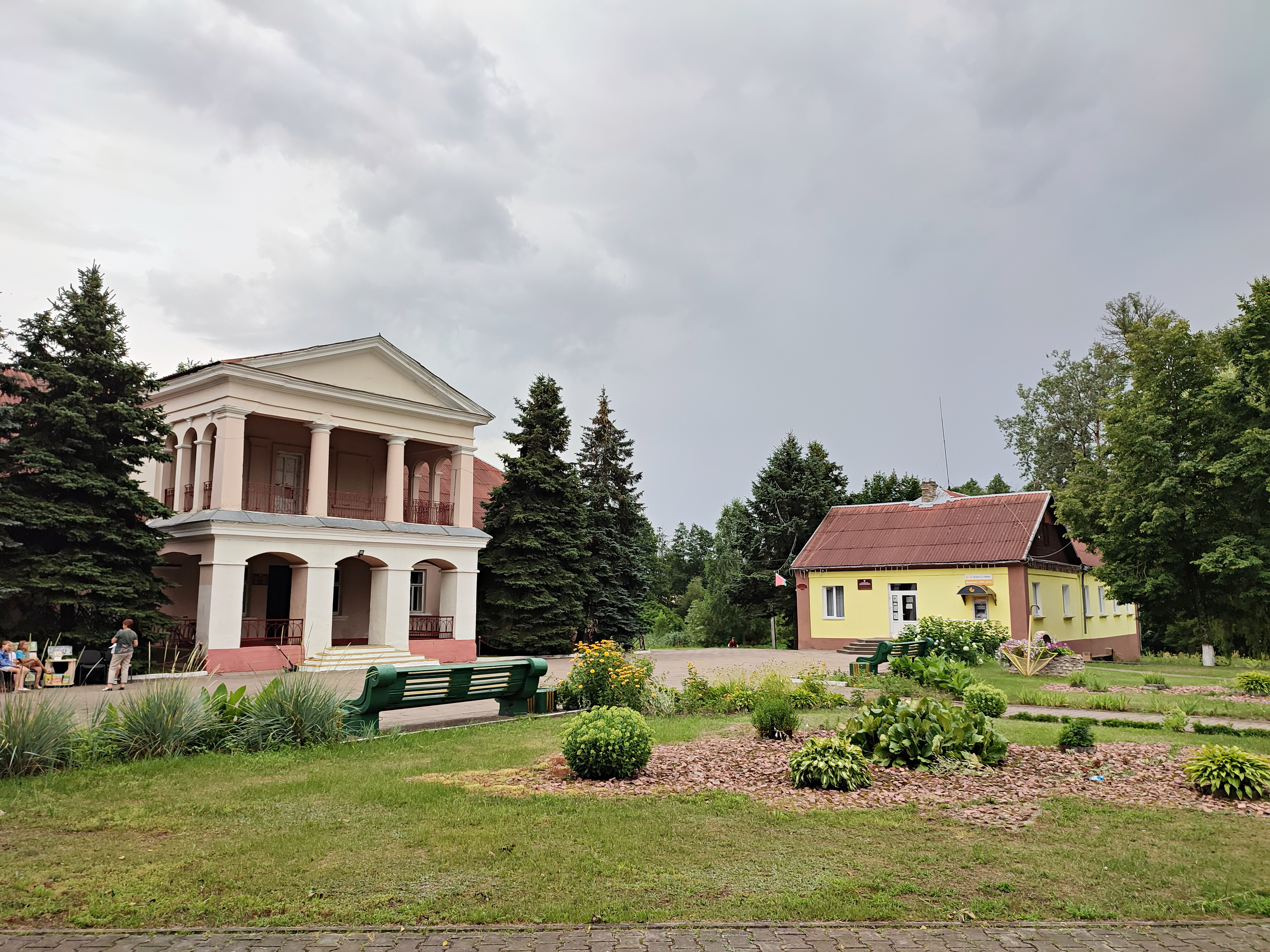
- Tarasewicz Manor

- Location within Belarus
- Coordinates: 53°7′27″N 24°20′40″E
- Country: Belarus
- Region: Grodno Region
- District: Vawkavysk District
- First mentioned: 15th century
- Time zone: UTC+3 (MSK)

Hniezna (Belarusian: Гнезна; Polish: Gniezno) is an agrotown in Vawkavysk District, Grodno Region, in western Belarus.

== History ==
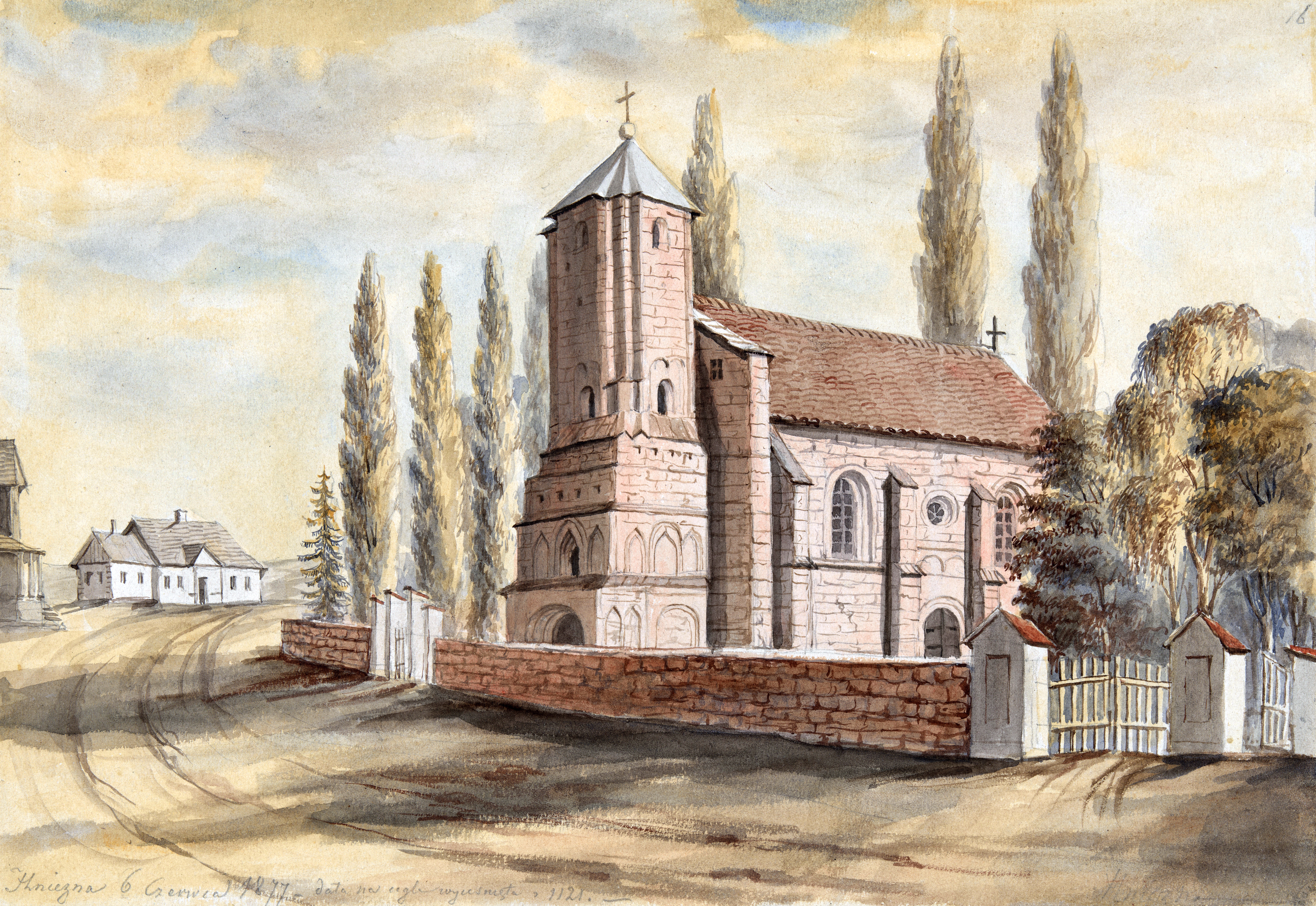
Local church on a 19th-century painting by Napoleon Orda

The settlement was first recorded in the mid-15th century. It was a possession of various nobles, including the houses of Szemioth, who built the local church in 1524, Chodkiewicz, Romer and Tarasewicz. It formed part of the Nowogródek Voivodeship within the Polish–Lithuanian Commonwealth.

Following the Third Partition of Poland in 1795, it was annexed by Russia. In 1812, it was devastated by French troops. In the 19th century there was a cloth factory there, eventually moved to nearby Wołkowysk, a distillery and barracks. As of the late 19th century there were more than 60 houses, the residents were affluent and almost all able to read Polish.

In the interwar period, Gniezno, as it was known in Polish, was administratively located in the Wołkowysk County in the Białystok Voivodeship of Poland. According to the 1921 census, the village with the adjacent manor farm had a population of 344, entirely Polish by nationality, and 93.9% Catholic, 3.2% Jewish and 2.9% Orthodox by confession.

Following the invasion of Poland in September 1939, Gniezno was first occupied by the Soviet Union until 1941, then by Nazi Germany until 1944, and then re-occupied by the Soviet Union, which eventually annexed it from Poland in 1945.

== Sights ==
Local landmarks are the Church of Saint Michael Archangel, built in the 1520s in Gothic style and later rebuilt in Renaissance style, and the historic manor of the Tarasewicz family.
