= Shchuchyn district =

District of Grodno region, Belarus

Shchuchyn district Шчучынскі раён (Belarusian) Щучинский район (Russian)
- District
- Flag Coat of arms

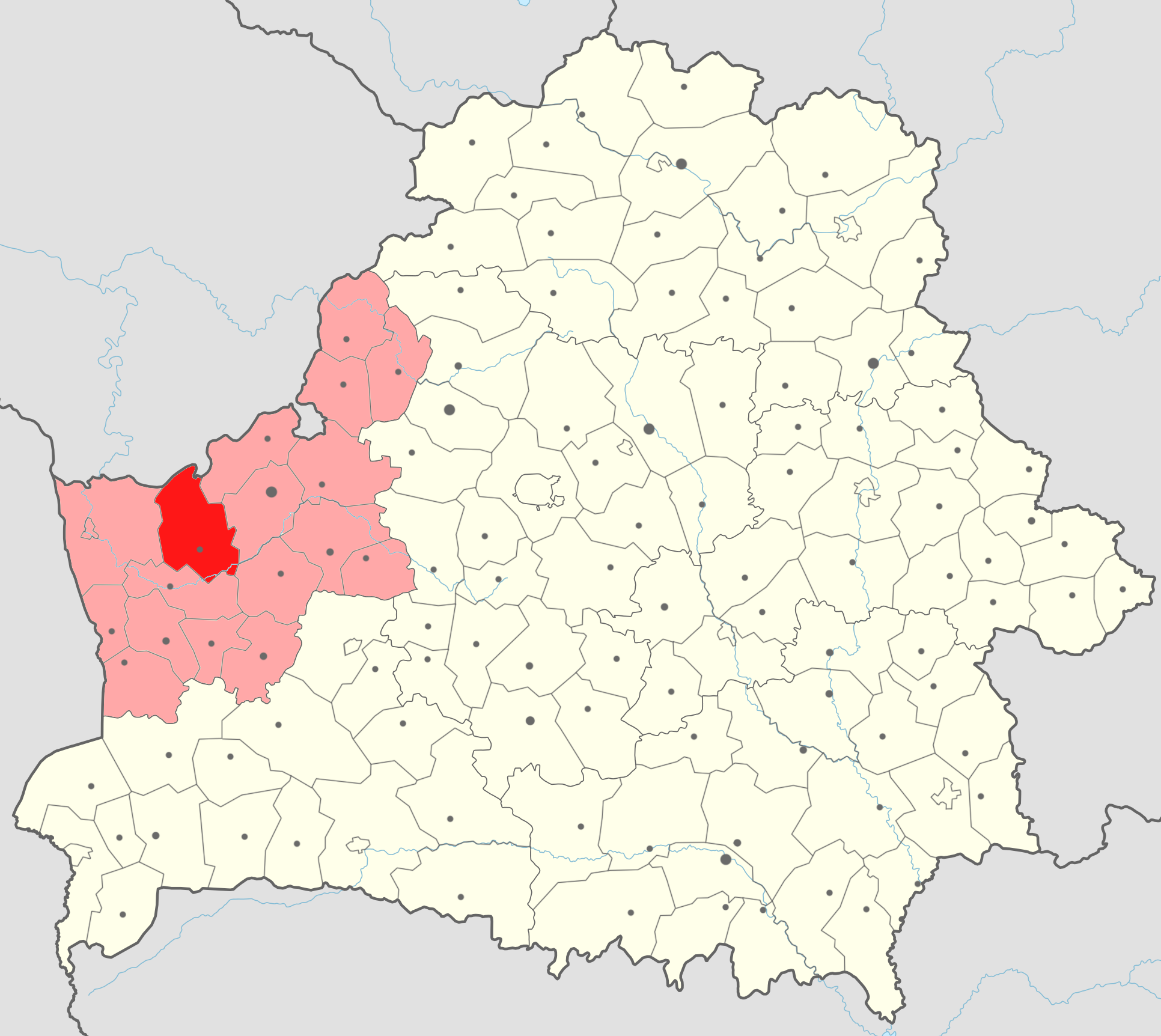
- Coordinates: 53°33′37″N 24°52′11″E
- Country: Belarus
- Region: Grodno region
- Administrative center: Shchuchyn

Area
  - District: 1,911.54 km^{2} (738.05 sq mi)

Population (2024)
  - District: 31,721
  - Density: 16.594/km^{2} (42.979/sq mi)
  - Urban: 17,863
  - Rural: 13,858
- Time zone: UTC+3 (MSK)

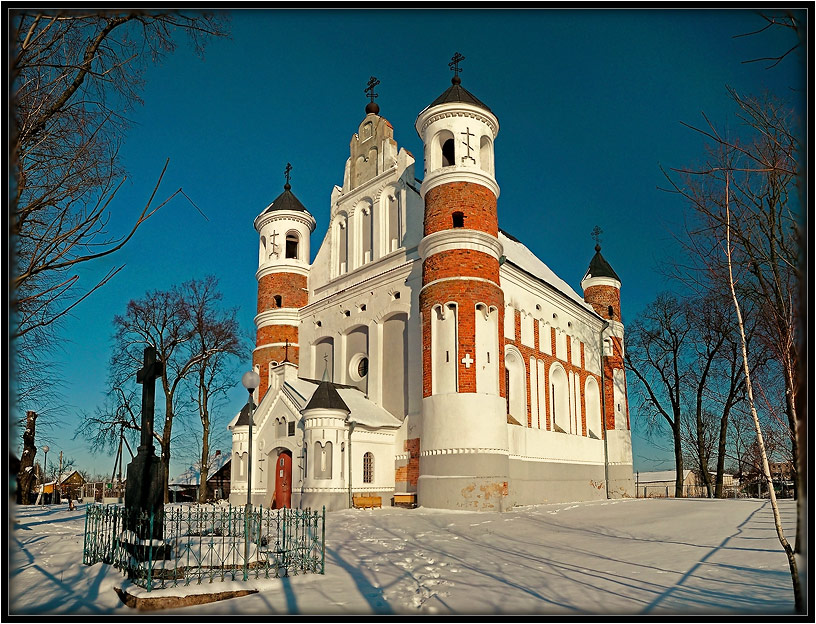
The Church of the Nativity of the Theotokos (1524) in the village of Muravanka.

Shchuchyn district or Ščučyn district (Belarusian: Шчучынскі раён; Russian: Щучинский район) is a district (raion) of Grodno Region in Belarus. The administrative center is Shchuchyn. As of 2024, it has a population of 31,721.

== Notable residents ==
- Vaclaŭ Ivanoŭski (also known as Vatslaw Ivanowski or Wacław Iwanowski) (1880 - 1943), Belarusian political and public figure of the first half of the 20th century
- Alaiza Pashkevich (pen name Ciotka) (1876 – 1916), Belarusian poet and political activist of the Belarusian national movement
