= Muravanka =

Village in Grodno Region, Belarus

Muravanka Мураванка (Belarusian)
- Village
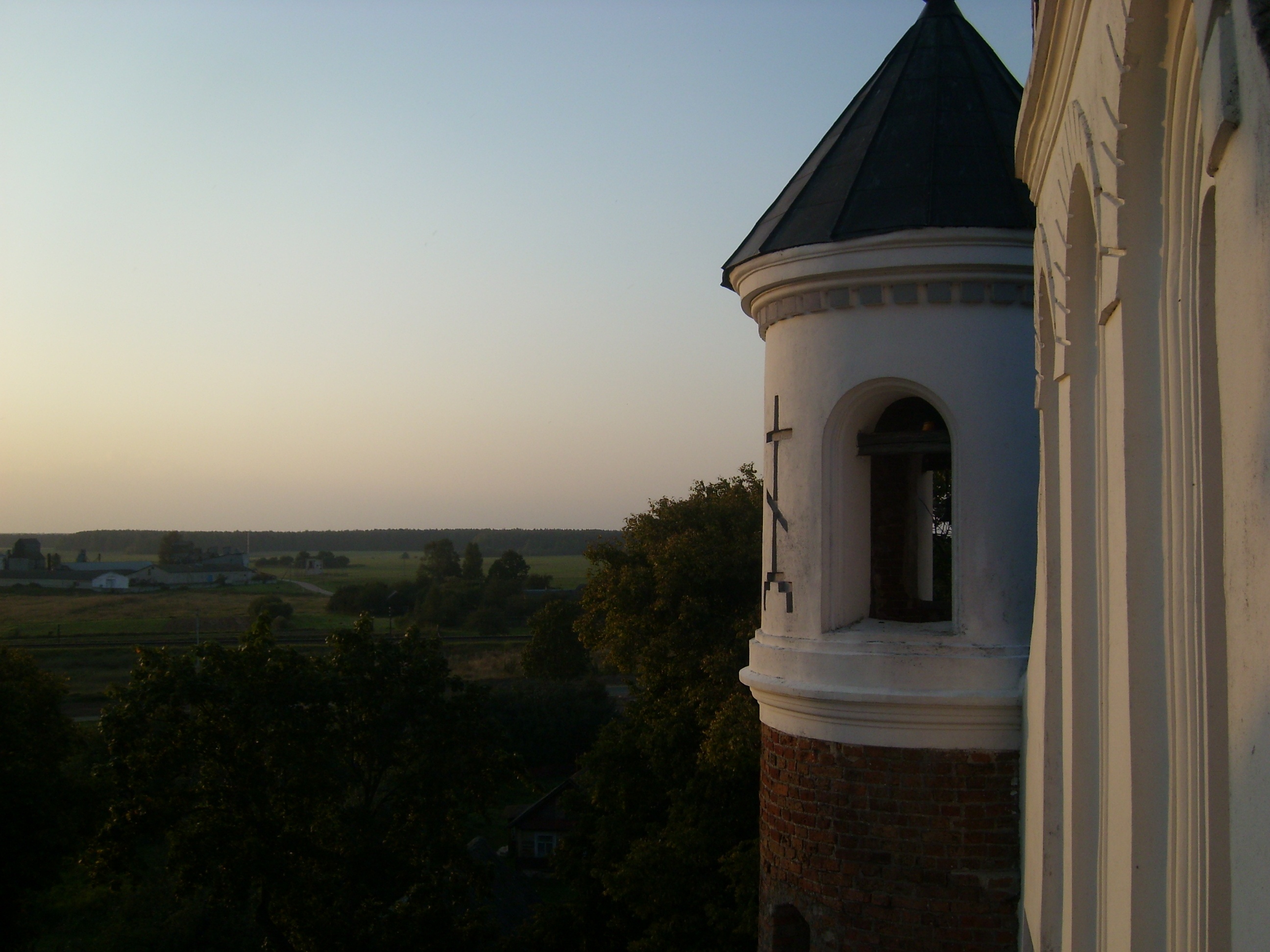

- Location within Belarus
- Coordinates: 53°41′54″N 25°00′11″E
- Country: Belarus
- Region: Grodno Region
- District: Shchuchyn District
- Elevation: 133 m (436 ft)

Population (2009)
  - Total: 176
- Time zone: UTC+3 (MSK)
- Postal code: 231503
- Area code: +375 1514

Muravanka (Belarusian: Мураванка; Russian: Мурованка, romanized: Murovanka) is a village in Shchuchyn District, Grodno Region, Belarus. It is part of Mazheykava selsoviet.

The village is famous for its fortified church of the Nativity of the Blessed Virgin Mary.

== Name ==
The village received its name after the brick walls of the church.

== History ==
Since foundation in the 16th century Muravanka was a part of the Grand Duchy of Lithuania. In 1795 the Polish–Lithuanian Commonwealth was partitioned between Russia, Prussia and Austria and the village became a part of the Russian Empire. After World War I it's a place in Nowogródek Voivodeship of the Second Polish Republic and after World War 2 it was returned to Belarus.
