= Kamei =

Kamei (亀井, "turtle well") is a Japanese surname.

- Japanese clan, Kamei clan
  - Kamei Koremasa (亀井 茲政, 1617–1681), Japanese daimyō, son of Masanori
  - Kamei Korenori (亀井 茲矩, 1557–1612), Japanese daimyō
  - Kamei Masanori (亀井 政矩, 1590–1619), Japanese daimyō, son of Korenori

People that have the name include:

- Akiko Kamei (亀井 亜紀子, born 1965), Japanese politician, daughter of Hisaoki
- Eri Kamei (亀井 絵里, born 1988), member of Morning Musume
- Fumio Kamei (亀井 文夫, 1908–1987), Japanese documentary film director
- Hideaki Kamei (亀井 秀明, born 1949), Japanese fencer
- Hirotada Kamei (亀井 広忠, born 1974), Japanese tsuzumi player
- Hisaoki Kamei (亀井 久興, born 1939), Japanese politician
- Ikuo Kamei (亀井 郁夫, 1933–2019), Japanese politician, older brother of Shizuka
- Jacky Kamei (born 1999), Japanese professional wrestler
- Kaori Kamei (亀井 薫, born 1976), Japanese announcer
- Katsuichiro Kamei (亀井 勝一郎, 1907–1966), Japanese literary critic
- Koreaki Kamei (亀井 茲明, 1861 1896), Japanese photographer
- Saburo Kamei (亀井 三郎, 1938–2013), Japanese voice actor
- Shinkichi Kamei (亀井 信吉, 1910–?), Japanese ice hockey player
- Shizuka Kamei (亀井 静香, born 1936), Japanese politician
- Yoshiko Kamei (亀井 芳子, born 1967), Japanese voice actress
- Yoshiyuki Kamei (亀井 善之, 1936–2006), Japanese politician
- Yoshiyuki Kamei (baseball) (亀井 善行, born 1982), Japanese baseball player
- Yuudai Kamei (亀井 雄大, born 1996), Japanese motorcycle racer
- Zentaro Kamei (亀井 善太郎, born 1971), Japanese politician
