= Kamai =

Kamai may refer to:

- Kamai, Belarus, a village in Belarus
- Kamai, Uttar Pradesh, a village in India

== See also ==
- Kamei, a Japanese surname
- Kamay (disambiguation)
- Kaimai Range a New Zealand mountain range
- Kaimai Tunnel a New Zealand rail tunnel
