= Church of Saint John the Baptist, Kamai =

Church of Saint John the Baptist
- Касьцёл Сьвятога Яна Хрысьціцеля
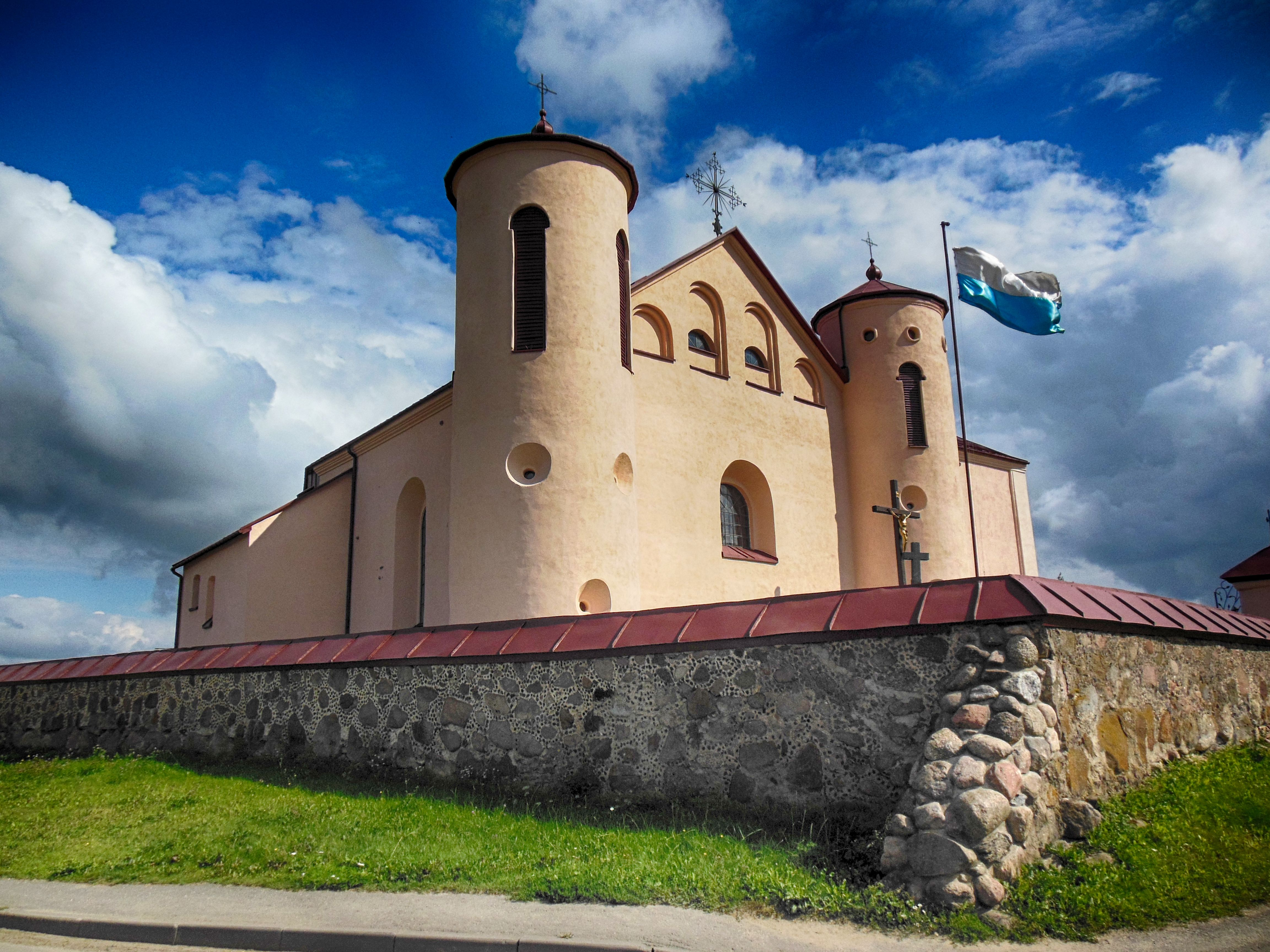
- Church of Saint John the Baptist
- 55°03′37″N 26°26′19″E
- Location: Kamai, Pastavy Raion, Vitebsk Region
- Country: Belarus
- Denomination: Catholic Church
- Website: Official website

History
- Status: Parish church
- Founded: 1603
- Founder(s): Jan Rudomin Dusiacki, Jan Chajecki

Architecture
- Functional status: Active
- Completed: 1606

Specifications
- Materials: Bricks

The Church of Saint John the Baptist (Belarusian: Касьцёл Сьвятога Яна Хрысьціцеля, Polish: Kościół Świętego Jana Chrzciciela) is a Catholic parish church in the village Kamai in the Pastavy District of Vitebsk Region, Belarus. The church is one of the fortified churches of the former Grand Duchy of Lithuania.

== History ==
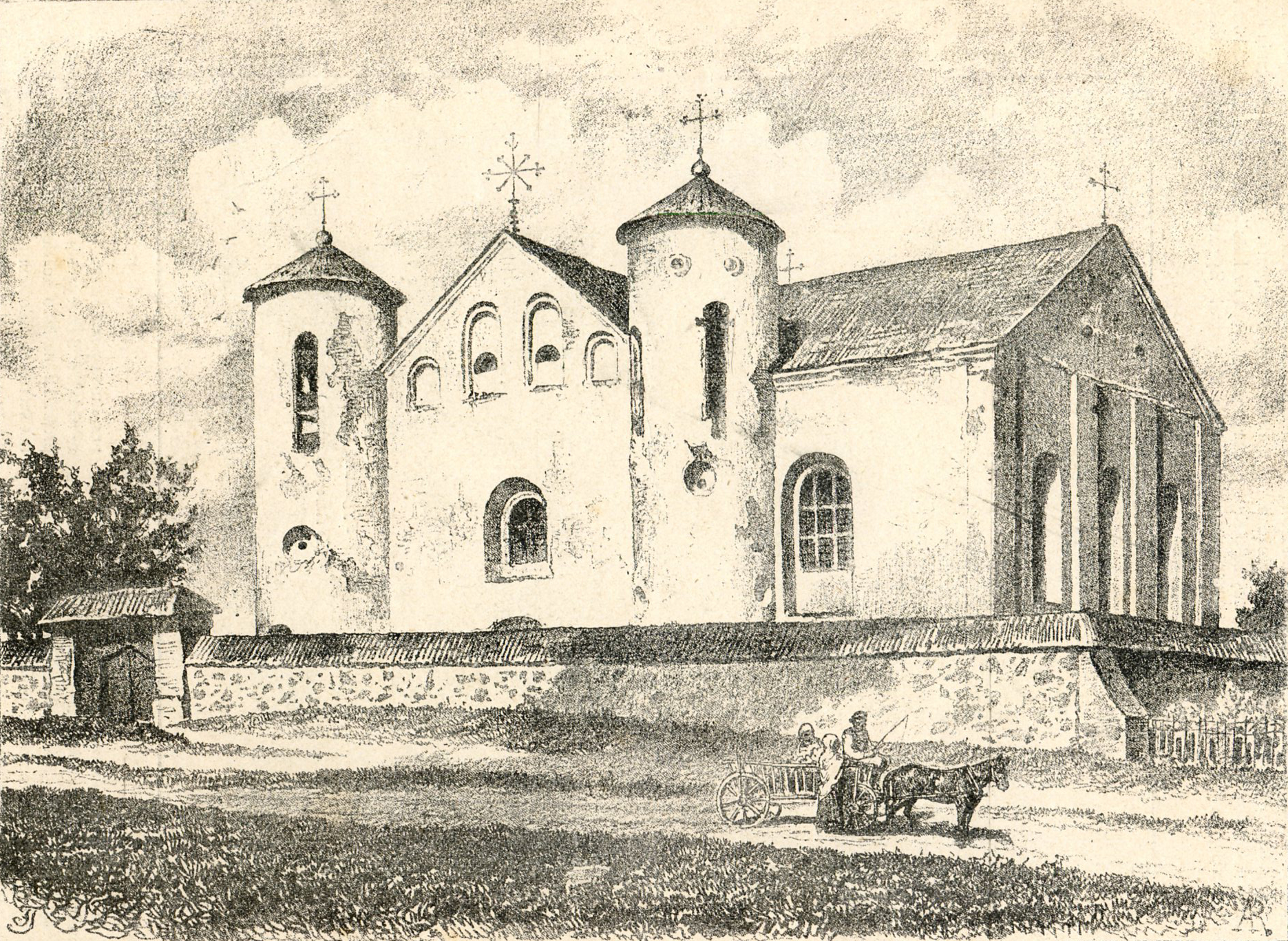
Kamai church in the 19th century.

The church in Kamai was founded in 1603 by Jan Rudomin Dusicki and Jan Hajecki. The name of the architect is unknown. Construction took three years so in 1606 the church was opened and was active since then. In 1643 a hospital was founded by the church for the dwellers of the village and nearby area.

During the war against Russia the church was burnt down by the Russian army, but rebuilt soon afterwards. In the Great Northern War the church got under cannon fire from the Sweden army and was damaged again. During the reconstruction of the building cannonballs were planted inside the walls as a tribute to the tragic war events.

In 1778 a chapel and a crypt were built by the southern side of the church.

The church was active even in Soviet times, which is a rare case as communists persecuted religion and closed or even ruined many churches around the country.

In 2010-2011 the church underwent a planned repair.

== Architecture ==
The church is a esthetic example of the defensive Gothic architecture once popular in the Grand Duchy of Lithuania. Only a limited number of fortified churches survived until now; it has a great historical and architectural value. Later Renaissance elements were added.

The church was initially built in a symmetrical way with three naves supported by four columns. After the church was damaged for the first time, the columns were removed and the church became a single-nave. Dimensionally it is close to the square and has an apse and a sacristy. The facade is flanked by two cylindrical towers with rounded embrasures. Both towers are sixteen meters tall and five meters in diameter with the walls over two meters in thickness.

The outer side of the church is almost free from the decorative elements except for four niches on the upper frontside.

There is an old cross near the church. It was installed about 15th-16th century. The cross is two and a half meters high and was carved of a single granite stone.

== World Heritage Status ==
This site was added to the UNESCO World Heritage Tentative List on January 30, 2004, in the Cultural category.

== Gallery ==
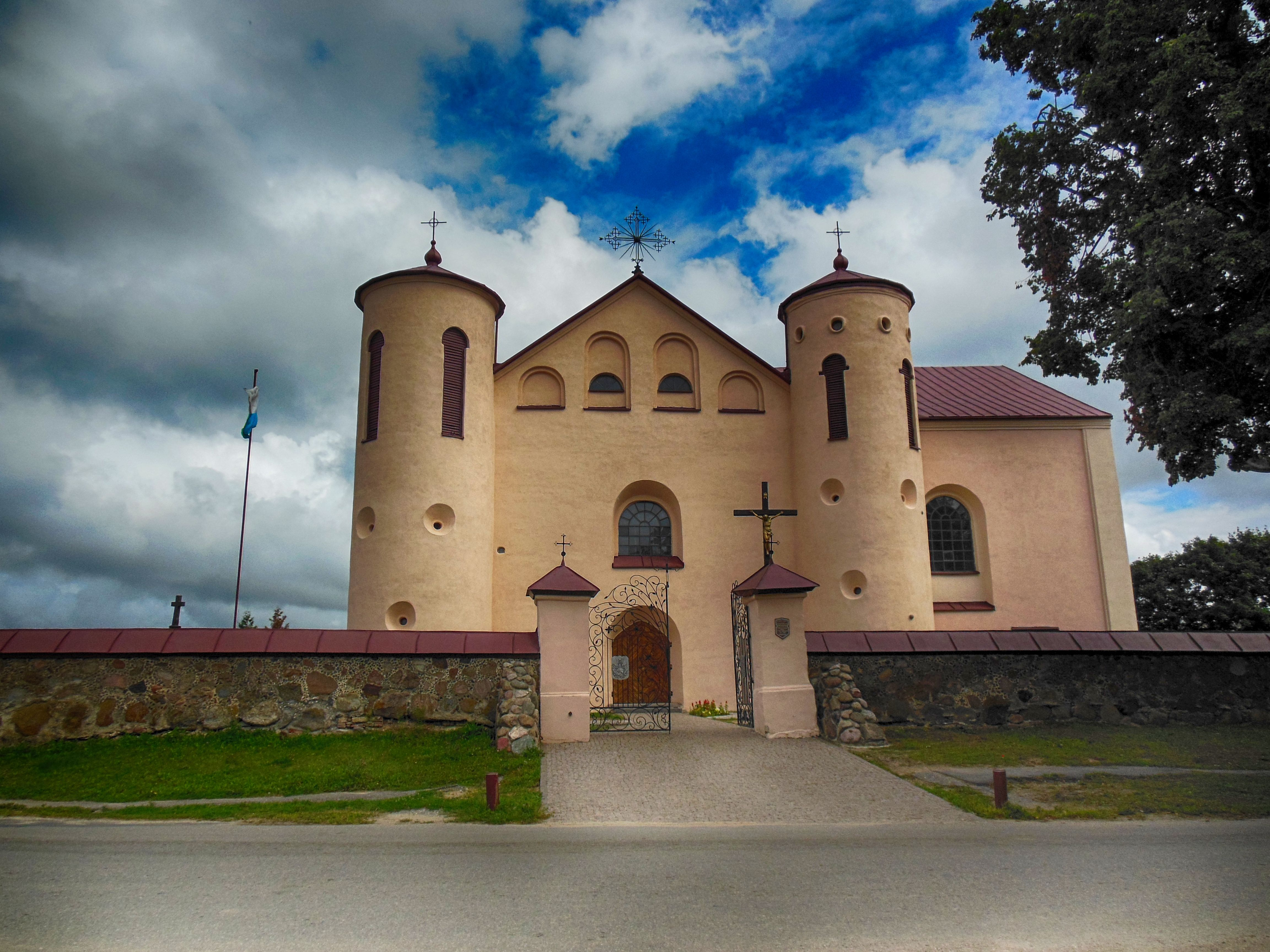
Frontside

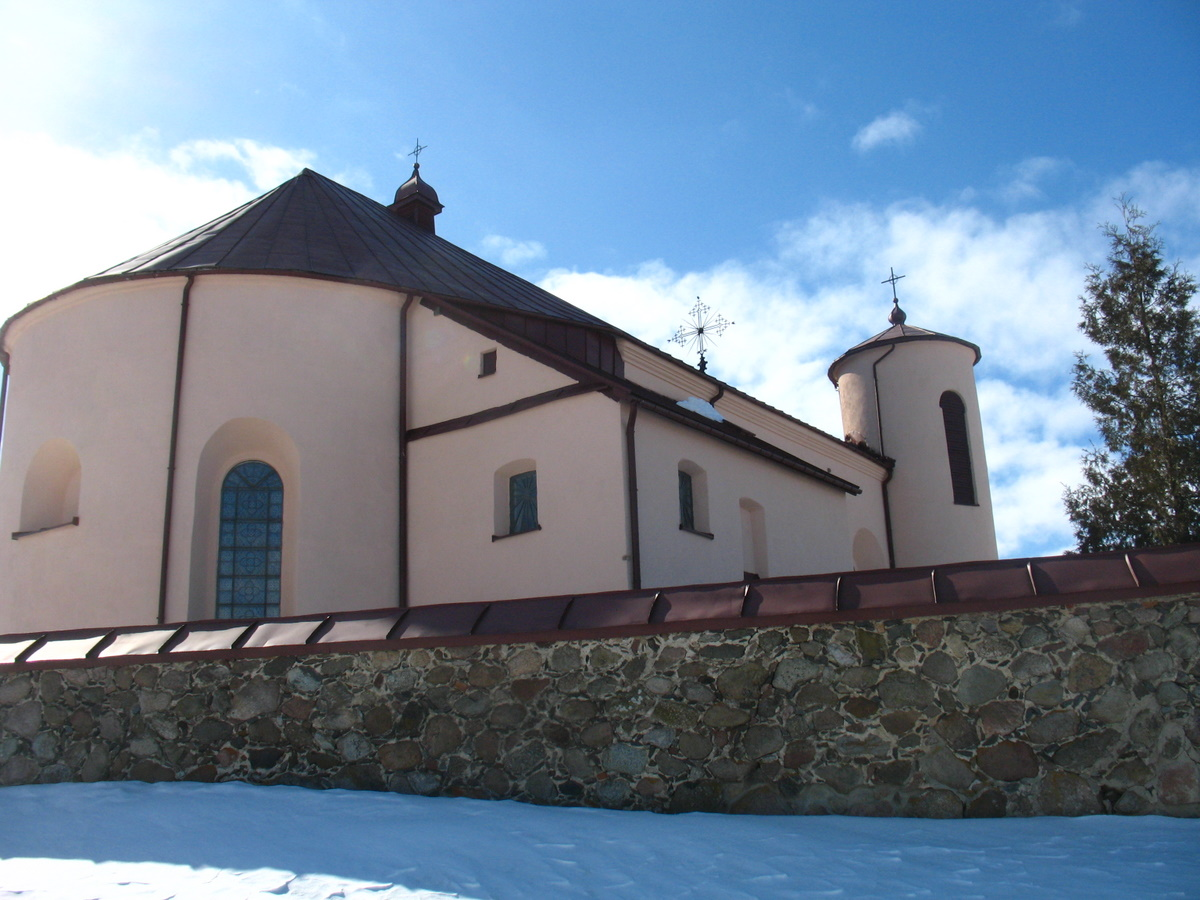
Backside

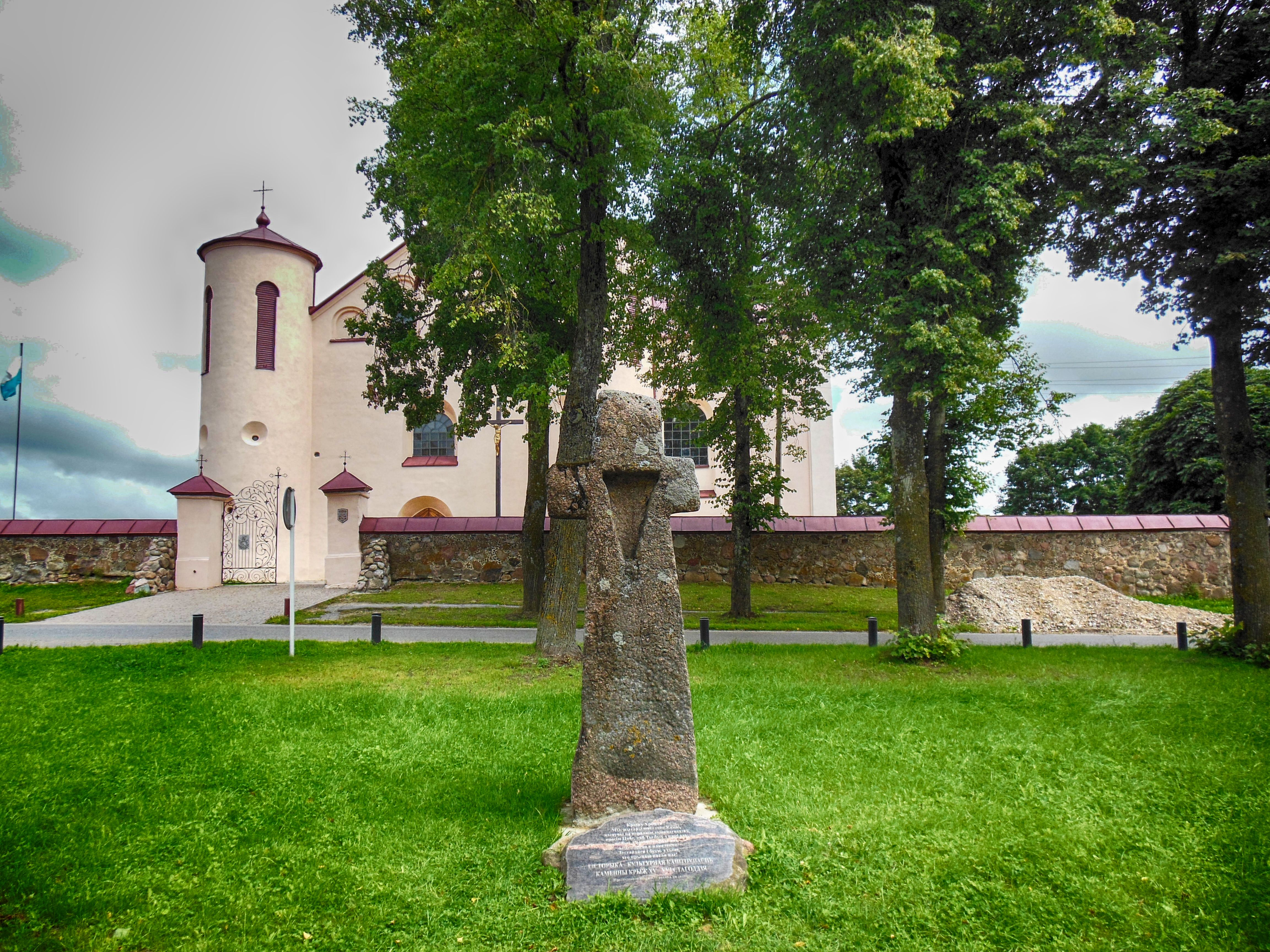
Cross near the church

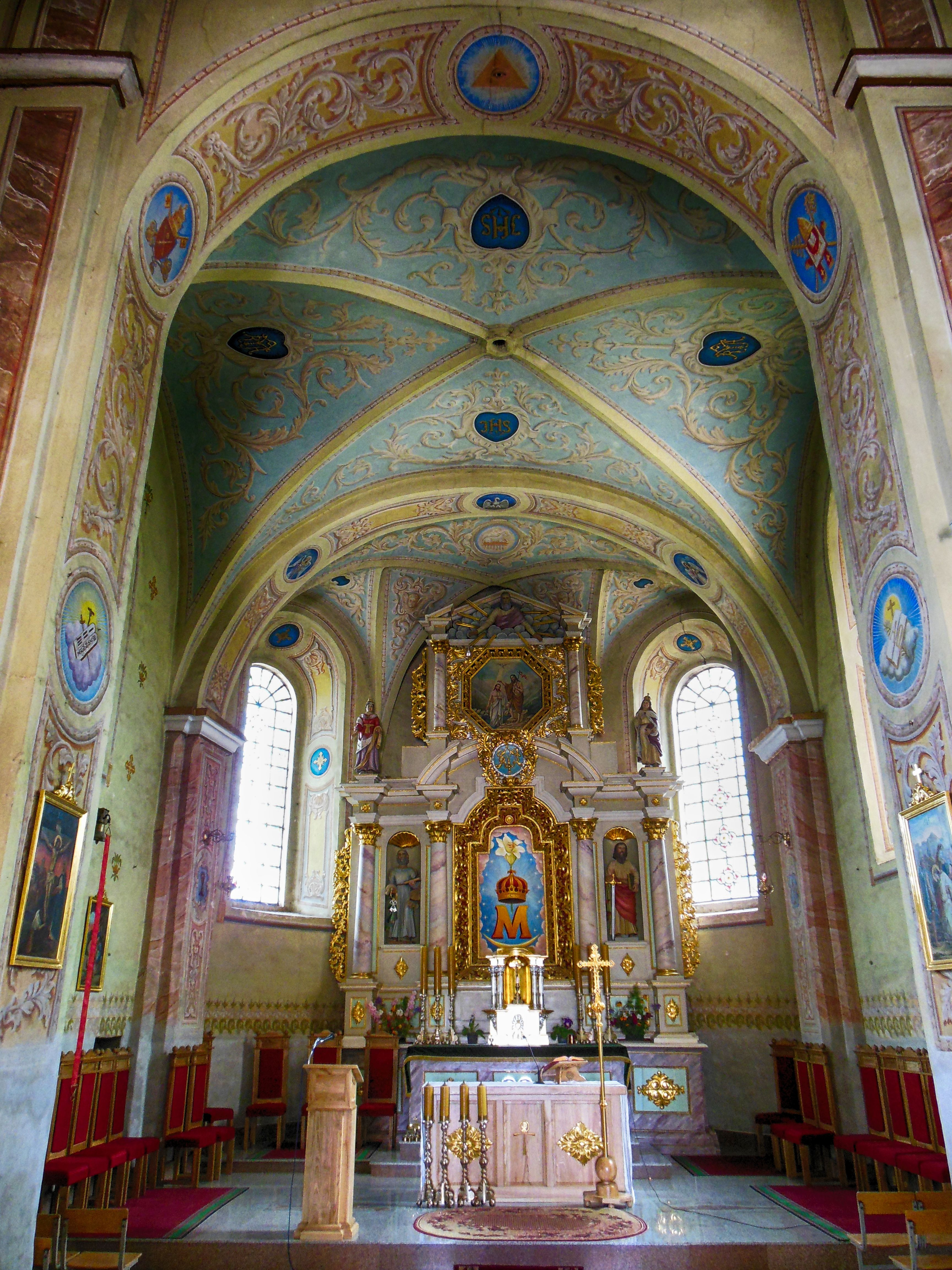
Inside

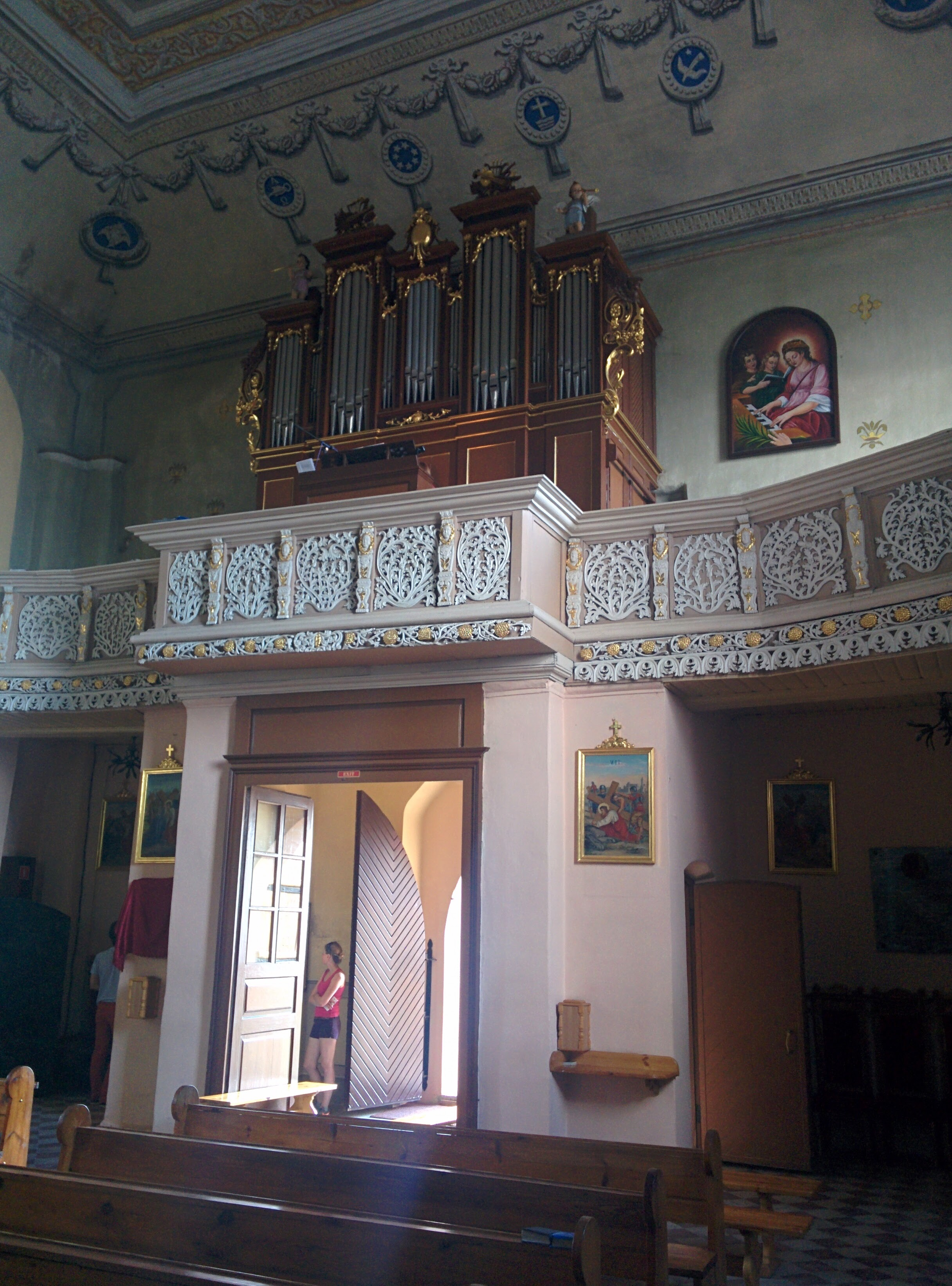
Pipe Organ

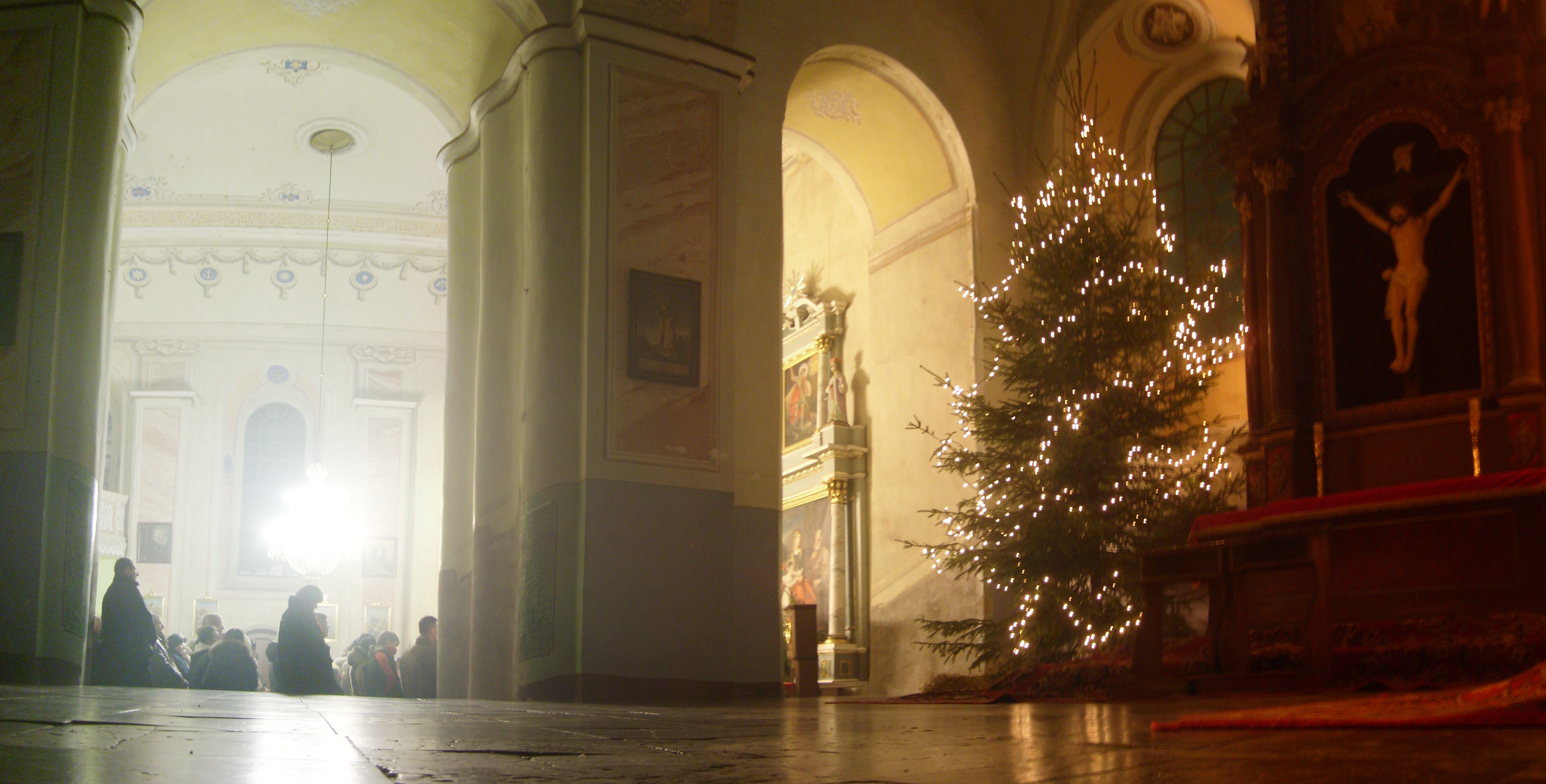
Christmas Eve
