= Tsuwano Castle =

- 津和野城
- Tsuwano, Shimane, Japan
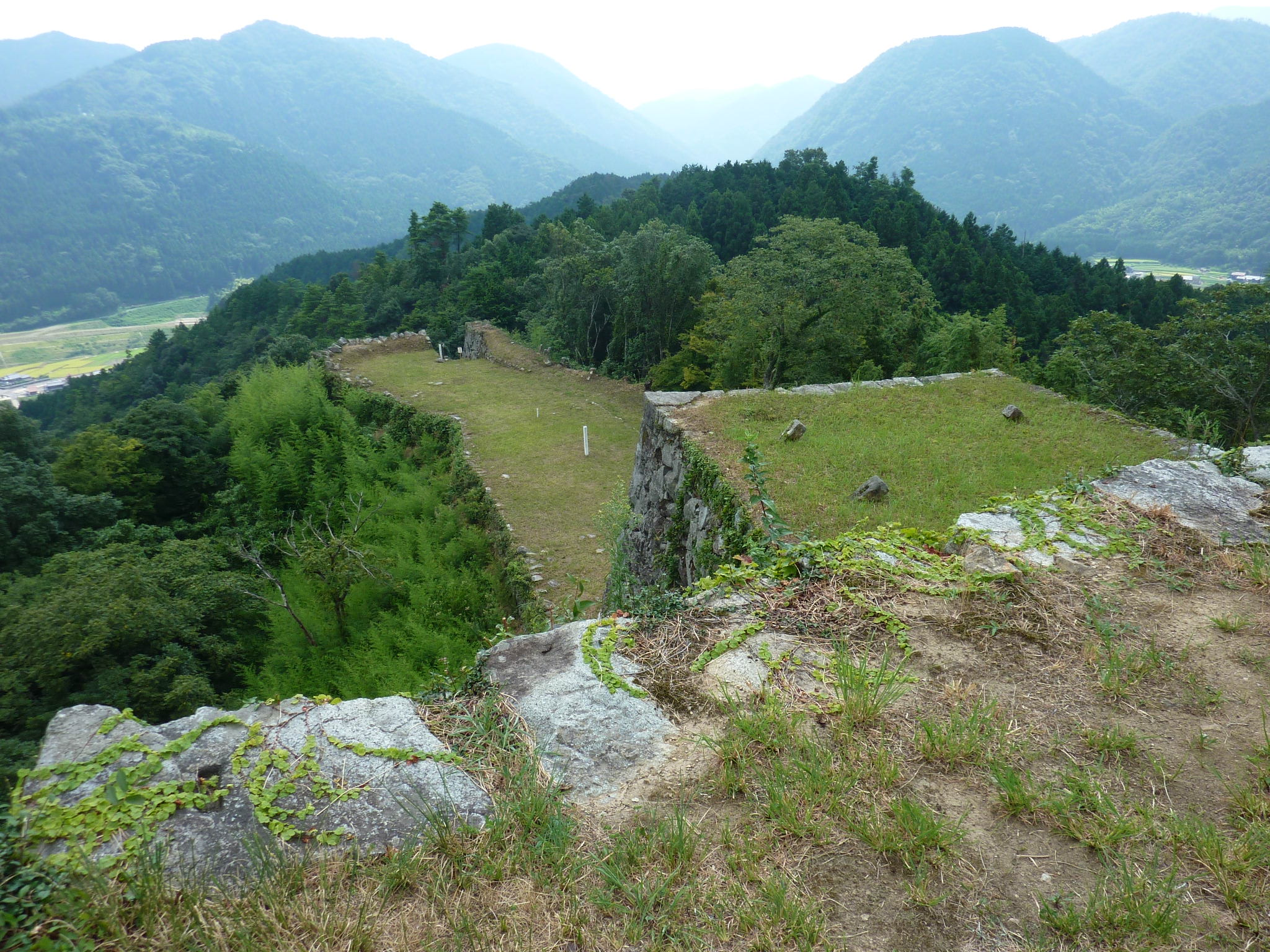
- Tsuwano Castle

Site information
- Type: Renkakushiki yamajiro-style Japanese castle
- Open to the public: yes
- Condition: Ruins

Location
- Tsuwano Castle Tsuwano Castle (Japan)
- Coordinates: 34°27′37″N 131°45′51″E

Site history
- Built: 1295
- Built by: Yoshimi clan
- In use: Kamakura-Edo period
- Demolished: 1871
- National Historic Site of Japan

Tsuwano Castle (津和野城, Tsuwano-jō) was a Japanese castle located in what is now the city of Tsuwano, Shimane Prefecture, in the San'in region of far western Japan. Its ruins have been protected by the central government as a National Historic Site since 1942. In its early history, it was called Sanbonmatsu Castle (三本松城, Sanbonmatsu-jō) or Ipponmatsu Castle (一本松城, Ipponmatsu-jō). During the Edo Period, it was the center of Tsuwano Domain ruled by the Kamei clan; however, the administrative offices and daimyō residence were located at the base of the mountain to avoid the steep mountain paths.

== History ==
Tsuwano Castle is located on the 200-meter Mount Shiroyama overlooking the Tsuwano jōkamachi. Tsuwano is situated in a valley at southwestern border of former Iwami Province with Nagato Province and is on the main route between the city of Yamaguchi and Hamada, as well as a secondary route across the Chugoku Mountains to Aki Province and the Seto Inland Sea. A castle was originally constructed in this location in 1282 in the late Kamakura period by Yoshimi Yoriyuki. This was just one year after the first of the Mongol invasions of Japan and although the castle was intended to defend the area against invasion, it was not completed until 1324. The Yoshimi clan claimed descent from Minamoto no Noriyori, the younger brother of Minamoto no Yoritomo. In the Muromachi period, the Yoshimi clan became closely aligned with the Ōuchi clan, who ruled Nagato and Suō Provinces and who grew wealthy due to trade with Ming China. Yoshimi Masayori (1513-1588) married the daughter of Ōuchi Yoshioki and supported the Ōuchi against the Amago clan and other rivals. However, in the Sengoku period, the defeats of Ōuchi Yoshitaka at Gassantoda Castle and other locations led to extreme dissatisfaction with him rule, cumulating in a coup led by Sue Harukata in 1551. The Sue clan was a close ally of the Masuda clan, who had been enemies of the Yoshimi for centuries. This led to Sue Harukata invading Iwami and besieging Tsuwano Castle for over four months. Taking advantage of his absence, Mōri Motonari, a small lord from Aki Province attacked and defeated the Sue at the Battle of Itsukushima in 1552. The Yoshimi clan quickly swore fealty to the Mōri clan. However, after the 1600 Battle of Sekigahara, the Mori clan were deprived of two-thirds of their territory by the Tokugawa shogunate, including Iwami Province. As retainers of the Mōri, this meant that the Yoshimi clan also lost their estates in Tsuwano and was forced to relocate to Hagi.

Sakazaki Naomori, one of Tokugawa Ieyasu's generals, was given a 30,000 koku (later increased to 43,468 koku) fief centered at Tsuwano. Sakazaki laid the foundations of Tsuwano Domain by building a castle town, conducting land surveys, and making major renovations to the castle, including building 15-meter high stone walls to enhance its defenses. The original Tsuwano Castle was a typical Muromachi-period fortified mountain, with enclosures spread out across a two-kilometer ridge extending north and south. Sakazaki reduced this to a 300-meter area surrounding the central peak, with an extension added where the mountain projected to a smaller peak to the west, forming a letter "T". In the central enclosure, he build a tenshu which was probably three-stories on a 20-meter square foundation and added numerous yagura turrets and compound gates.

In 1616, Sakazaki was either killed or committed seppuku over the "Senhime incident". He had been promised Ieyasu's daughter Senhime as his wife if he rescued her from Osaka Castle during the Siege of Osaka; however, afterwards Ieyasu gave her to Honda Takatoki instead. The incensed Sakazaka plotted to kidnap her, but the plot was discovered by the shogunate, and the Sakazaka clan was destroyed. The shogunate relocated the Kamei clan from Shikano Castle in what is now Tottori Prefecture to replace the Sakazaki, and the Kamei clan remained rulers of Tsuwano Castle over 11 generations to the Meiji restoration. In 1686, the tenshu was lost due to a fire caused by lightning and was never rebuilt.

Following the Meiji restoration, the last daimyō of Tsuwano, Kamei Koremi took action before the Meiji government issued new laws, and ordered the destruction of the castle. One gate survived as it was relocated to Hamada, where it was used as the gate of a local government office, and two yagura were preserved at the foot of the mountain. Tsuwano Castle was listed as one of Japan's Top 100 Castles by the Japan Castle Foundation in 2006. The site of the daimyō residence is now the Shimane Prefectural Tsuwano High School.

From Tsuwano Station on the JR West Yamaguchi Line, it is a 20-minute walk to a chairlift station to the castle ruins.

== See also ==
- List of Historic Sites of Japan (Shimane)

== Gallery ==
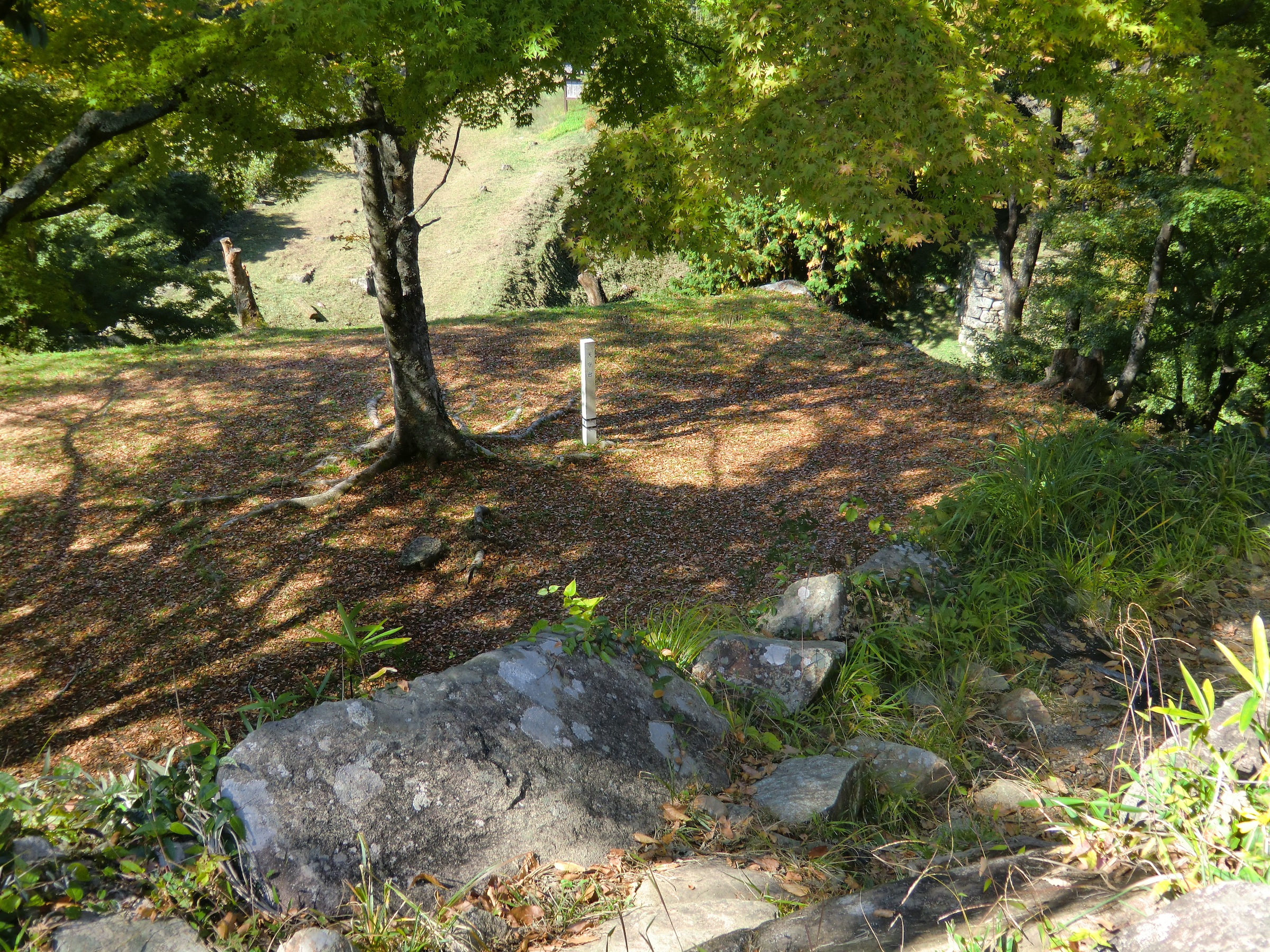
Foundations for Tenshu

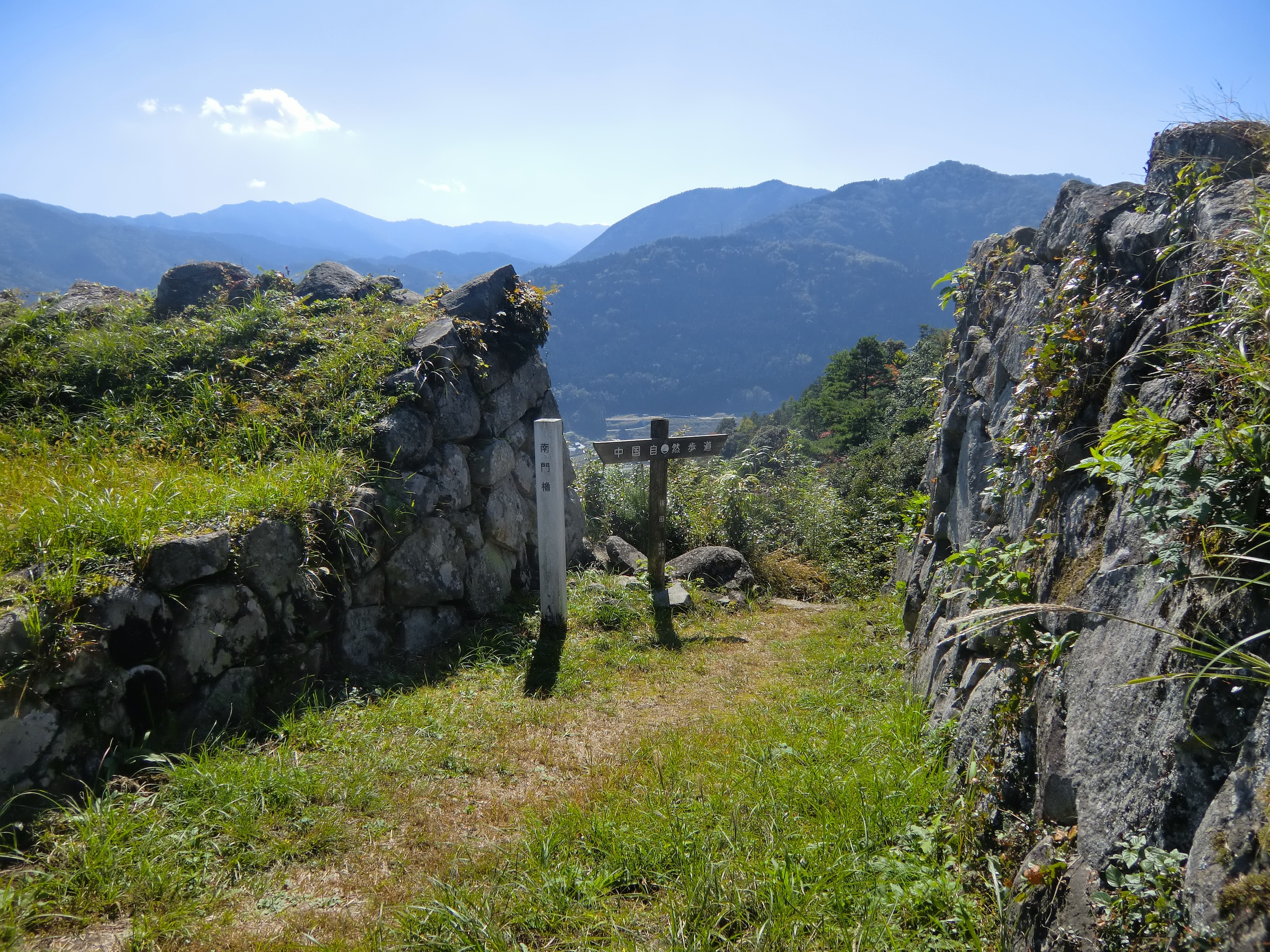
Site of South Gate

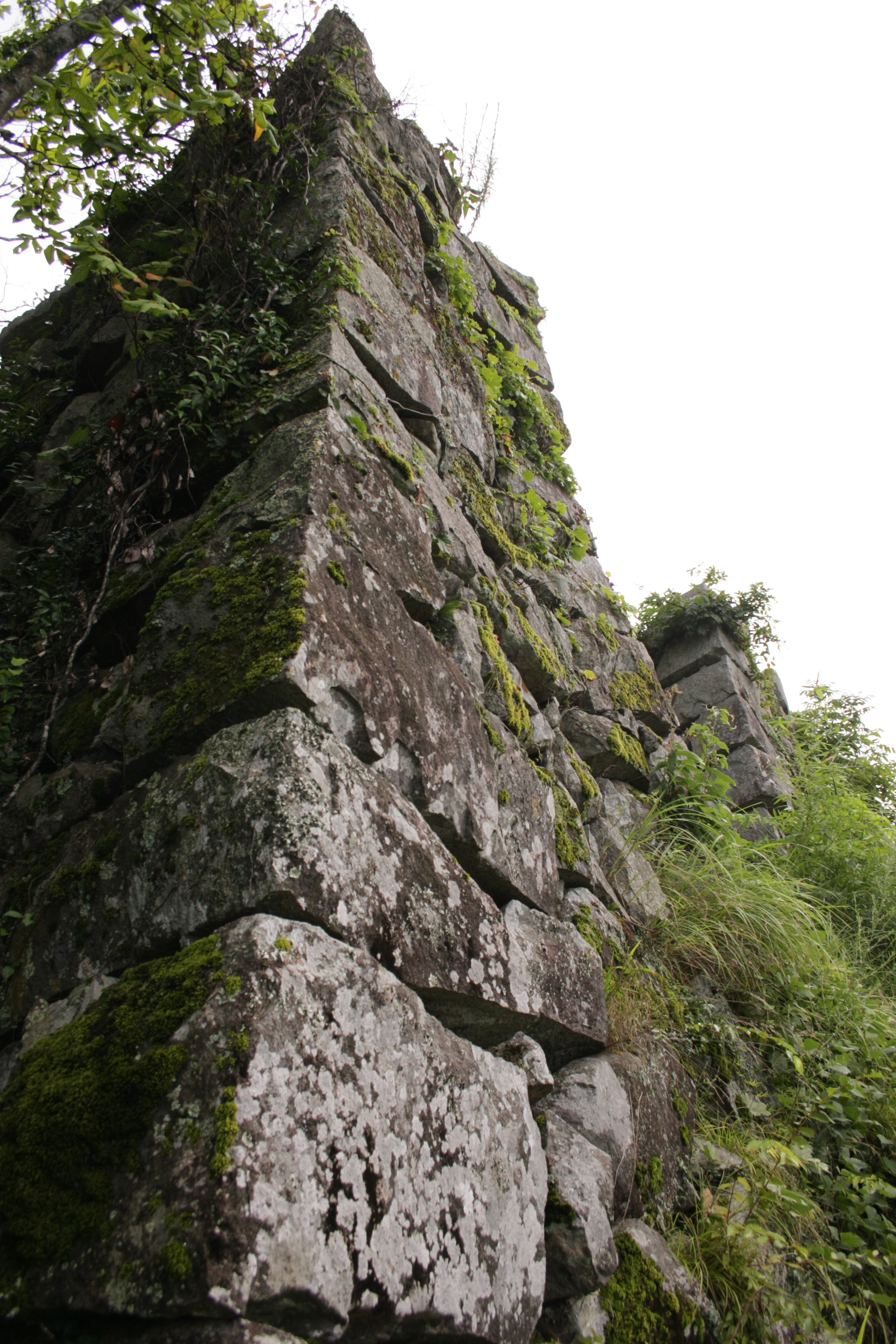
South Gate Yagura stone walls

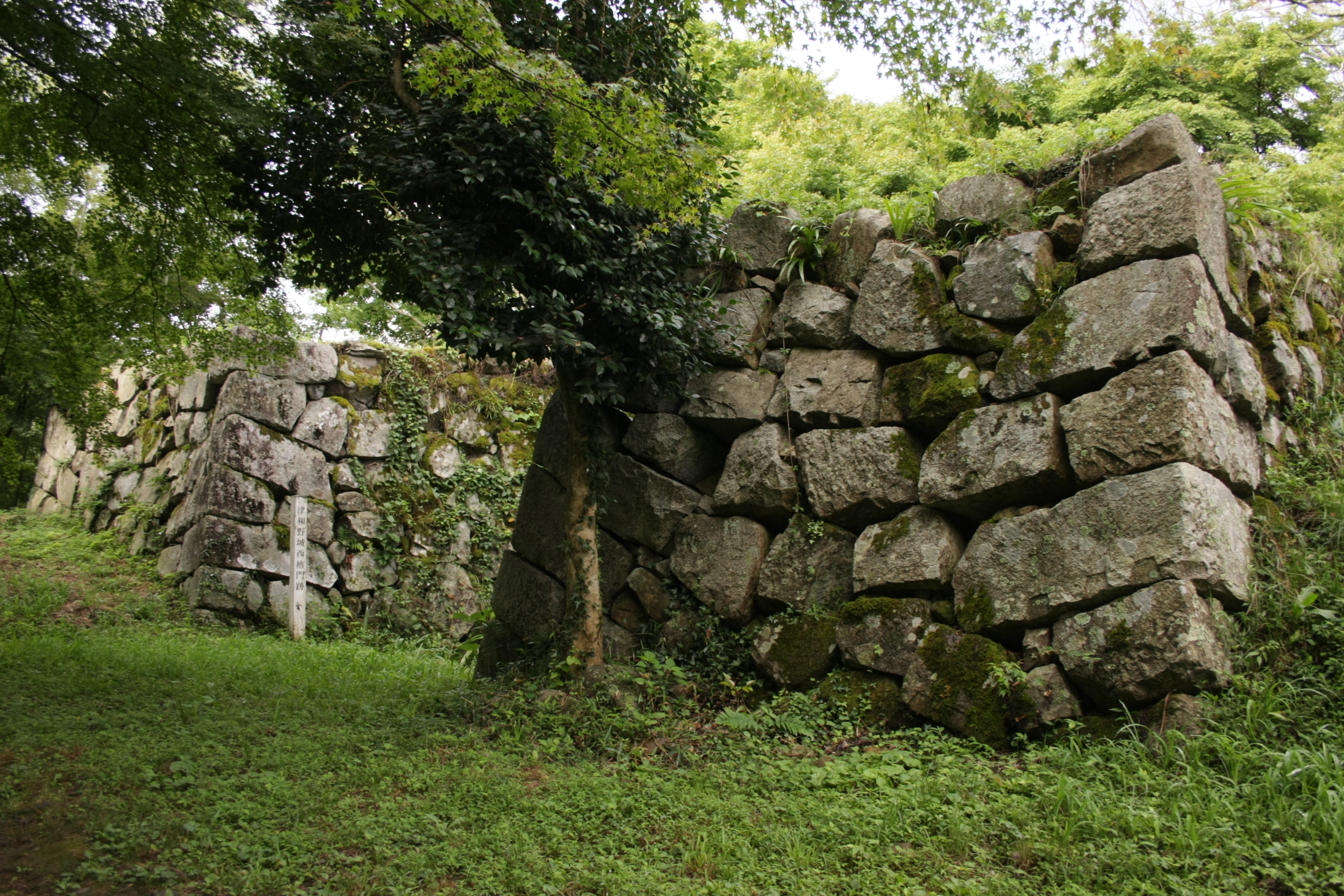
West Gate Yagura stone walls

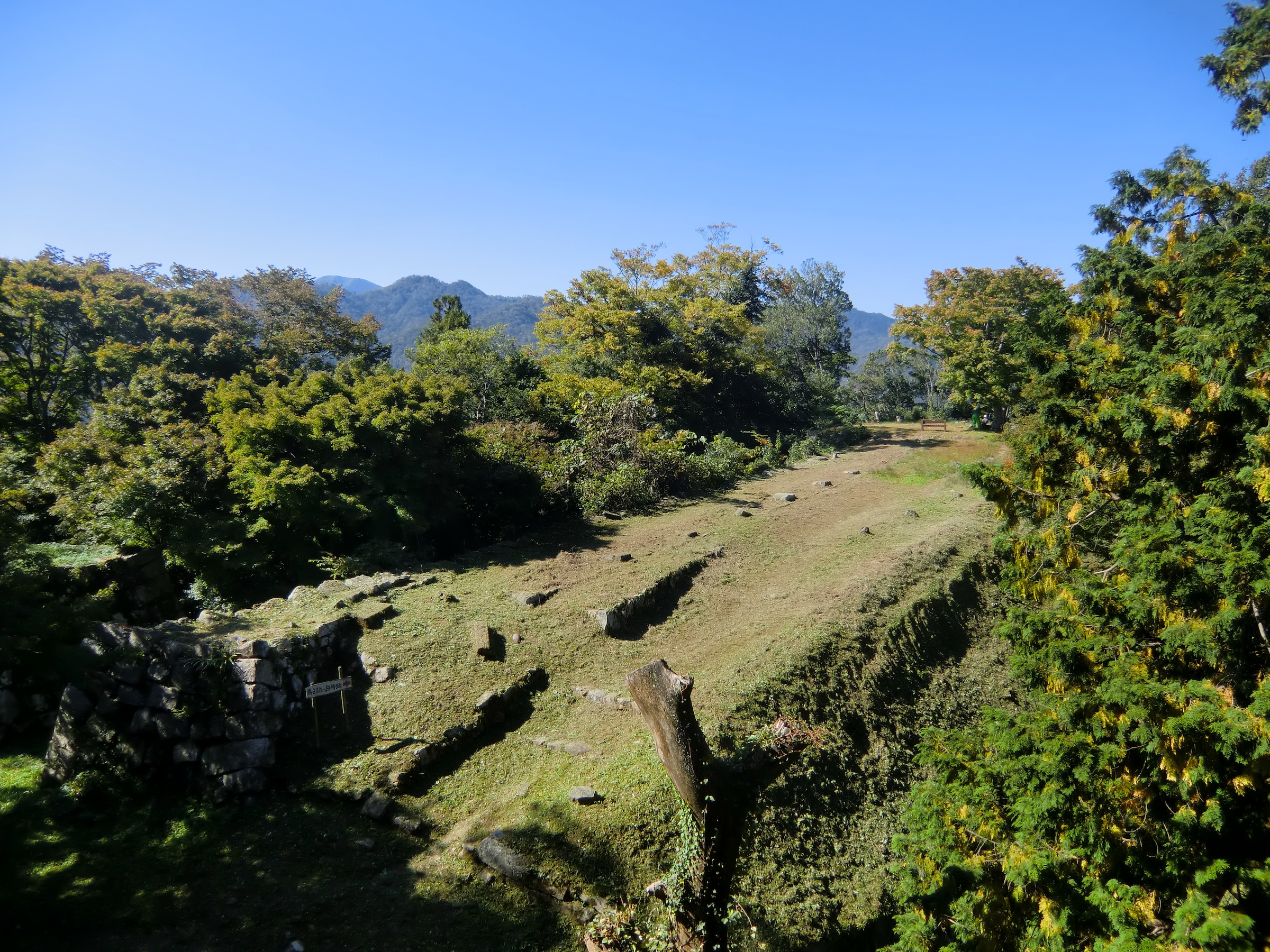
San-no-maru Enclosure

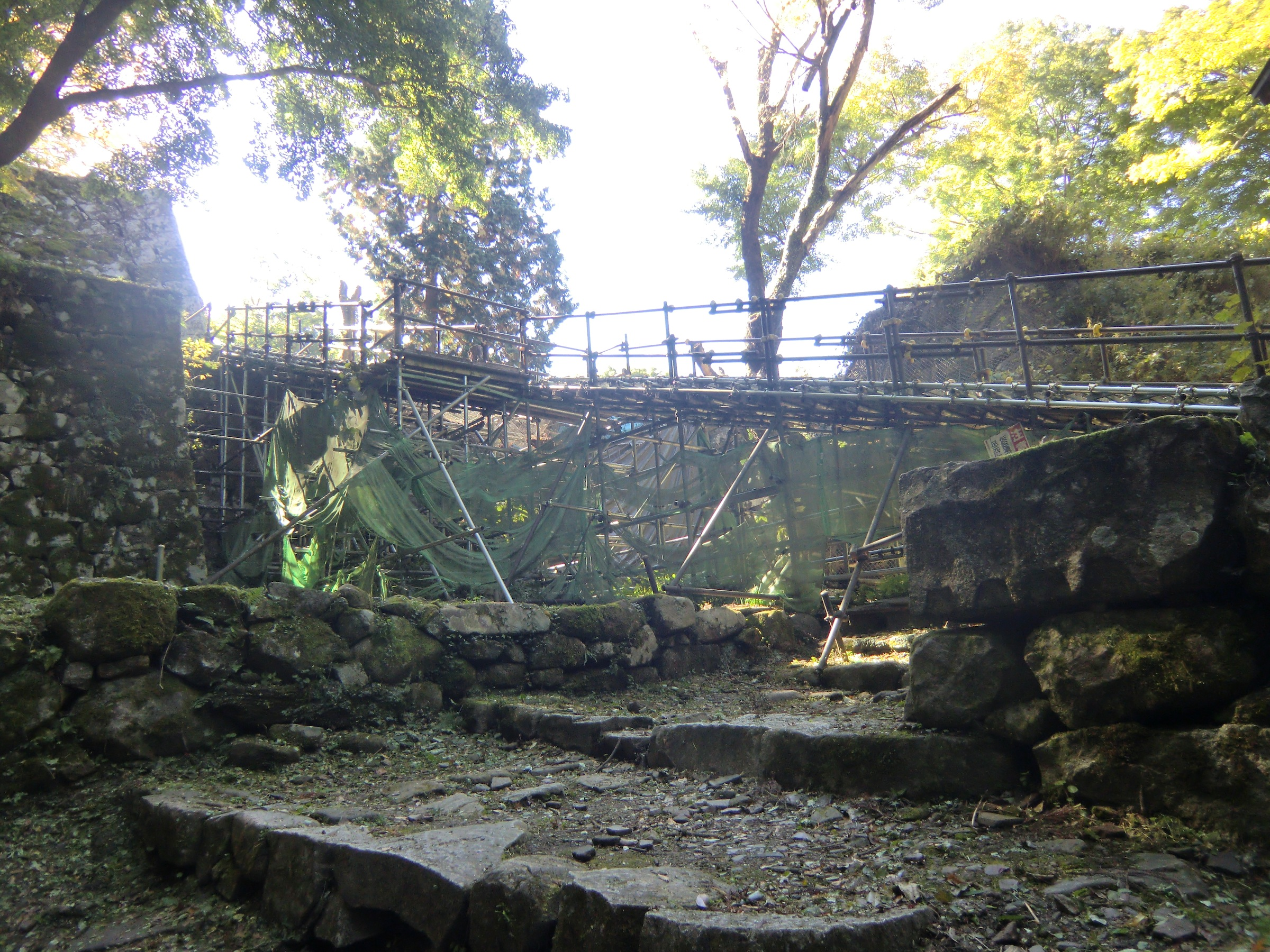
Site of East Gate

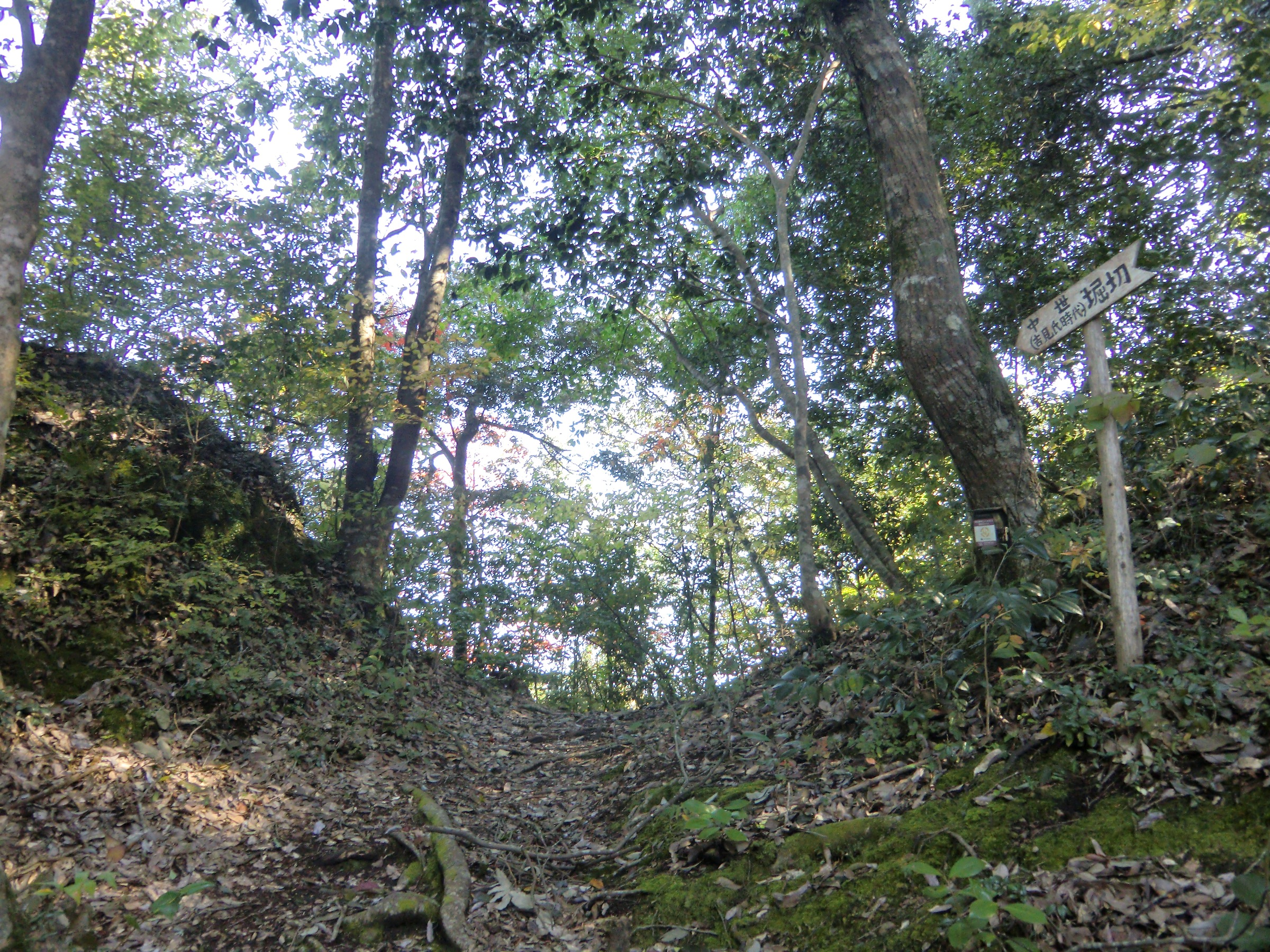
Dry Moat

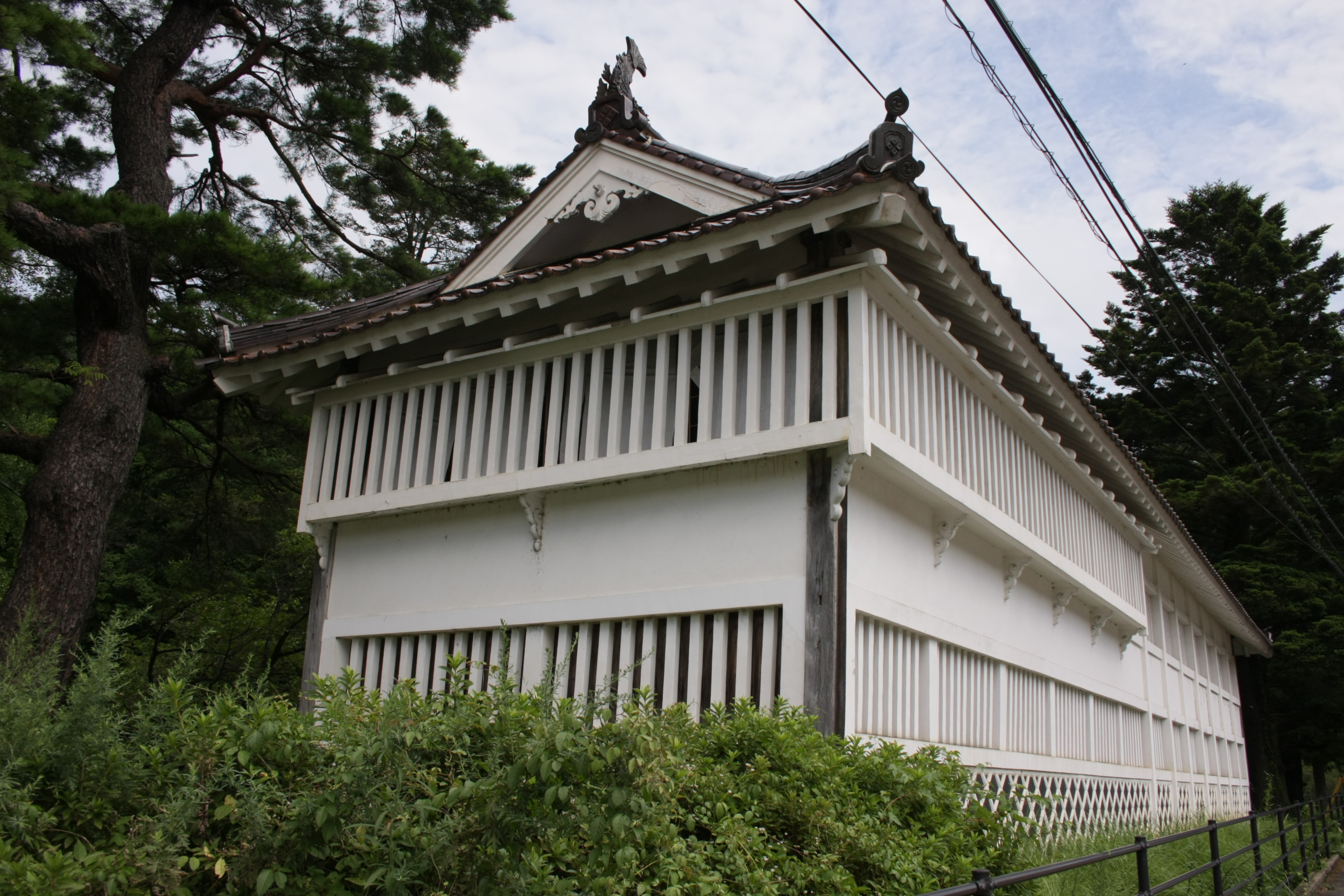
Monomi Yagura

== Literature ==
- De Lange, William (2021). An Encyclopedia of Japanese Castles. Groningen: Toyo Press. pp. 600 pages. ISBN 978-9492722300.
- Schmorleitz, Morton S. (1974). Castles in Japan. Tokyo: Charles E. Tuttle Co. pp. 144–145. ISBN 0-8048-1102-4.
- Motoo, Hinago (1986). Japanese Castles. Tokyo: Kodansha. p. 200 pages. ISBN 0-87011-766-1.
- Mitchelhill, Jennifer (2004). Castles of the Samurai: Power and Beauty. Tokyo: Kodansha. p. 112 pages. ISBN 4-7700-2954-3.
- Turnbull, Stephen (2003). Japanese Castles 1540-1640. Osprey Publishing. p. 64 pages. ISBN 1-84176-429-9.
