= Naomori =

- Gender: Male

Origin
- Origin: Japanese
- Meaning: Different meanings depending on the kanji used

Naomori (written: 直盛) is a masculine Japanese given name. Notable people with the name include:

- Ii Naomori (井伊 直盛; 1506–1560), Japanese samurai
- Sakazaki Naomori (坂崎 直盛; 1563–1616), Japanese daimyō
