= Kamai, Belarus =

Agrotown in Vitebsk Region, Belarus

Kamai Камаі (Belarusian) Камаи (Russian)
- Agrotown
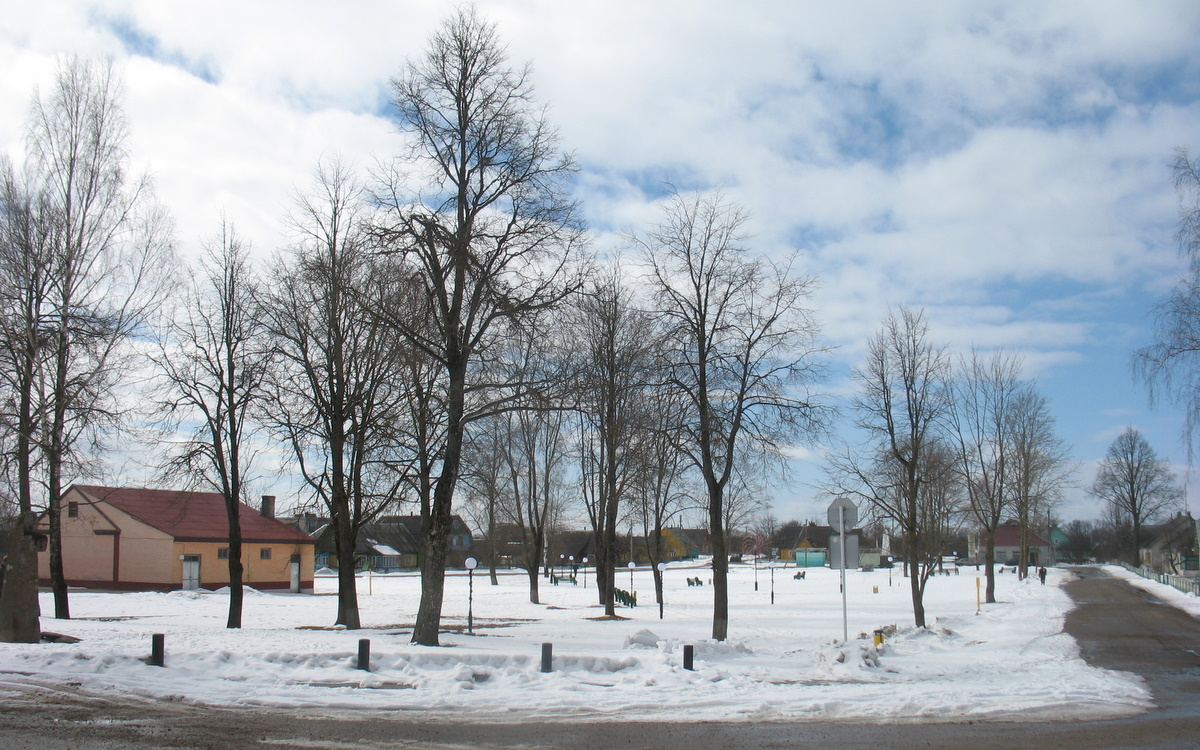

- Location within Belarus
- Coordinates: 55°03′33″N 26°36′10″E
- Country: Belarus
- Region: Vitebsk Region
- District: Pastavy District

Population (2010)
  - Total: 773
- Time zone: UTC+3 (MSK)
- Postal code: 211862
- Area code: +375 02155

Kamai (Belarusian: Кама́і; Russian: Кама́и; Lithuanian: Kamojys; Polish: Komaje) is an agrotown in Pastavy District, Vitebsk Region, Belarus. It serves as the administrative center of Kamai selsoviet. It is located near the border with Lithuania.

The village is known for its fortified church of St. John the Baptist.

== History ==
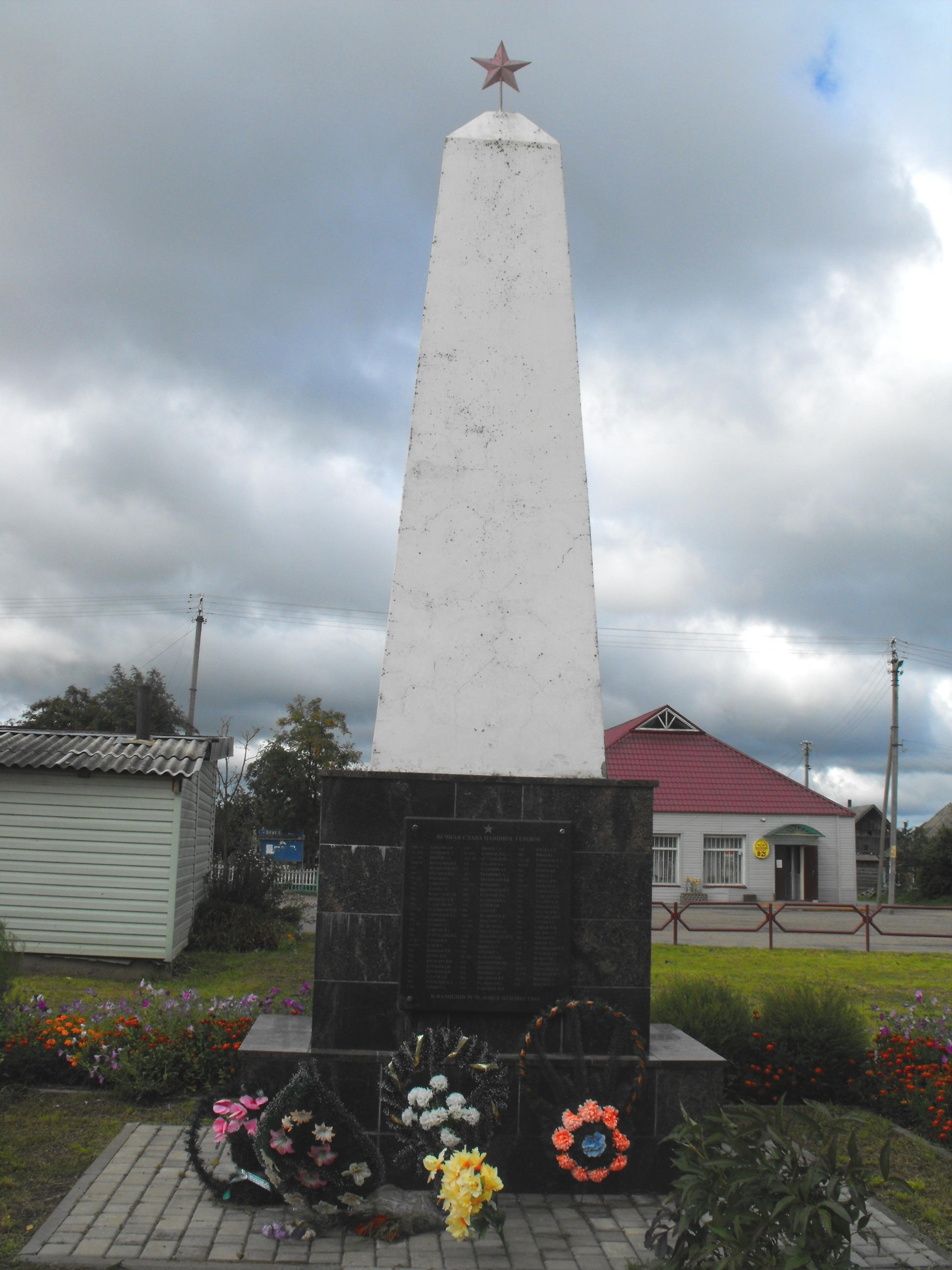
The monument

The village is mentioned for the first time at the beginning of the 16th century, when it was a part of the Grand Duchy of Lithuania. In 1550, it was a populated place in the Ashmiany paviet of Vilna Voivodeship. In 1603-1606, Jan Rudomin Dusiacki built here a stone catholic church, dedicated to Saint John the Baptist. In 1643, a hospital for men and women was created.

In 1795. it became a part of the Russian Empire. In 1863-1864, inhabitants of the village took action in the national movement for independence against Russia.

In the Interwar period, Kamai was part of Poland, and after the World War II became part of Belarusian SSR.

Historically, the territory of Kamojys was part of the Lithuanian ethnic lands. In the mid-nineteenth century, the linguistic border between Lithuanian language and Belarusian traversed Kamojys, with both languages being spoken in this area. Prior to the Second World War, the number of individuals in the Kamojys area who spoke Lithuanian ranged from 300 to 500. In 1942, the Nazi occupiers decreed the incorporation of Kamai into the General District of Lithuania. In 1942, 10% of the population of the Kamai district identified themselves as Lithuanians. Between 1942 and 1944, a total of 12 Lithuanian primary schools were established in the Kamojys district.

After Belarus gained independence, it became a village in Pastavy Rajon. In 2000s, it joined the state program for rural development and became an agrotown.
