= Kamay =

Kamay may refer to:

- Abot Kamay, album
- Kamay, Texas
- Kamay Botany Bay National Park, Sydney

== See also ==
- Kamai (disambiguation)
