= Cultural heritage of Belarus =

A plaque installed on heritage objects

The cultural heritage of Belarus includes both material and immaterial assets (valuables), in accordance with the Law on Protection of Historical and Cultural Heritage of the Republic of Belarus (2006).

Material historical and cultural assets, movable and immovable, include (Article 13):

- Documentary monuments;
- Nature reserves;
- Monuments of archaeology;
- Monuments of architecture;
- Monuments of history;
- Monuments of urban design;
- Monuments of arts

These assets are classified as follows (Article 16):

- Category 0, inscribed or proposed for inscription on the World Heritage List;
- Category 1, otherwise of international significance;
- Category 2 of national importance;
- Category 3 of regional importance

Non-material assets, including traditions, rites, folklore, folk arts, and language, are classified as (Articles 14, 16):

- Category A, if fully authentic and invariable;
- Category Б, if recast into a different medium and/or where their documentary value may change over time

The State Register of Historical and Cultural Values of the Republic of Belarus (Belarusian: Дзяржаўны спіс гісторыка-культурных каштоўнасцей Рэспублікі Беларусь) and Databank are maintained (Article 8).

In 2007, a total of 4,811 objects of heritage were listed, of which 4,694 were material, including 1,655 architectural monuments, 1,125 historical monuments, and 57 art monuments.

Current 07-07-2020 objects of heritage list.

== Code ==
Every asset has a unique 10-character alphanumeric code of the following template: nnnAnnnnnn

The first character refers to its location

1 — Brest Region;
2 — Vitebsk Region;
3 — Gomel Region;
4 — Grodno Region;
5 — Mogilev Region;
6 — Minck Region;
7 — Minsk;
8 — abroad

The second character refers to its type

1 — tangible immovable assets
2 — tangible movable assets
3 — intangible assets

The third character refers to its category (0,1,2,3)

The third character refers to its more detailed classification

А — documents
Б — nature reserves
В — archaeological
Г — architectural monuments
Д — historical monuments
Е — urban design
Ж — arts
М — collection
Н — set (камплект)

Six last characters is zero-padded number of the asset in the order of its inclusion into the Register

== See also ==
- Culture of Belarus
- World Heritage Sites in Belarus
