= Kamei Korenori =

Japanese daimyō (1557–1612)

Kamei clan’s mon

Kamei Korenori (亀井 茲矩; 1557 – February 27, 1612) was a Japanese daimyō who lived through the early Edo period. He was first a retainer under the Amago clan of Izumo Province, but eventually became a daimyō in his own right.

== Early life ==
His father, Kamei Hidetsuna, was killed in battle against the Mōri clan when the Mōri invaded and seized the Amago clan's lands, leaving no heir to the Kamei name. Korenori then took on this name, and in 1566, together with his brother-in-law, Yamanaka Shikanosuke, to whom he was related by virtue of marrying the younger sister of Shikanosuke's wife, he made efforts to reclaim these lands for the Amago, and to destroy Mōri Motonari and his army. However, the Amago clan fell in 1578, leaving Korenori without his lords; he then entered the service of Toyotomi Hideyoshi. His childhood name was Shinjuro (新十郎).

== Family ==
- Foster Father: Kamei Hidetsuna
- Father: Yu Nagatsuna
- Mother: Tako Tokitaka‘s daughter
- Wives:
  - Tokiko, Kamei Hidetsuna‘s daughter
  - Tago Shigemori’s daughter
- Children:
  - Kamei Masanori by Tago Shigemori’s daughter
  - daughter married Matsudaira Tadakiyo

== Daimyō ==
Receiving Shikano castle in Inaba Province as a reward for his notable service in 1578, Korenori ascended to higher rank as he assisted in Hideyoshi's 1587 invasion of Kyūshū. Interested in earning further fortunes in foreign trade, he requested to obtain lands in the coastal domains of Izumo Province, which possessed high quality harbors, in recognition of his past service against the Mōri and other clans of Kyūshū. However, his request was denied, as Izumo had already been given to the Mōri as a part of the truce agreements between the Mōri and Hideyoshi. Korenori then asked for the Ryukyu Islands instead; a paper fan inscribed with the date, Hideyoshi's signature, and the title "Kamei, Lord of Ryukyu" (亀井琉球の守, Kamei Ryūkyū no kami), found by Korean forces on a ship captured during Hideyoshi's invasions of Korea serves as evidence that Hideyoshi at least nominally offered the post to Korenori. However, Hideyoshi had no rightful claim to the islands, which were at the time the independent Ryūkyū Kingdom. Korenori sent a small force to take control of the islands, but was blocked by the Shimazu clan of Satsuma Province, who jealously guarded a special relationship, including exclusive trading rights, with the kingdom.

Korenori was thus unable to wield any actual claim or control over the islands, and following Hideyoshi's death in 1598, entered the service of Tokugawa Ieyasu. Following the Sekigahara Campaign of 1600, his income was raised from 13,000 to 43,000 koku as a reward for his service to the Tokugawa clan. Korenori died of natural causes in 1612.

Korenori's descendants were eventually made daimyō (lords) of the Tsuwano Domain, which they ruled until the Meiji Restoration (1868).

| Preceded by none | 1st Daimyō of Shikano (Kamei); 1582–1612 | Succeeded by Kamei Masanori |
