= Zygmunt Czechowicz =

Belarusian independence activist

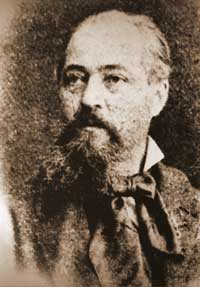
- Born: August 19, 1831; Surviliški estate, Vilnia province (now - Belarus)
- Died: October 27, 1907 (aged 76); Malyja Biasiedy (now - Belarus)
- Known for: one of the leaders of the 1863-1864 January Uprising

Zygmunt Czechowicz-Lachowicki alis Lachowicz (Belarusian: Зыгмунт Чаховіч; 19 August 1831 – 27 October 1907) was one of the leaders of the January Uprising.

== Early years ==
Czechowicz was born in the Surviliški estate in the Vilna Governorate (now Pastavy District in Vitsebsk Region of Belarus) into the family of a chamberlain who took part in the 1830-1831 November Uprising. He was the son of Bernard Czechowicz-Lachowicki and Józefa nee Mirska. His family was using the Ostoja coat of arms.

In 1851 he finished the Vilna Noble Institute and later graduated with honours from St. Petersburg University.

== January Uprising and arrest ==
During the January Uprising Czechowicz became a member of the Vilnia Committee of the Movement and then a secretary in the Department of Leaders of the Provinces of Lithuania. He was a supporter of the radical policies of Konstanty Kalinowski.

On 31 July 1863 Czechowicz was arrested after being identified by a Tsarist spy. He was sentenced to death; however, the sentence was later commuted to 10 years of hard labour, following intervention by Konstanty Mikołaj Radziwiłł on his behalf. He served his sentence in the Nerchinsk katorga mines in Transbaikal.

== Later years ==
After his release, Czechowicz lived in the Malyja Biasiady estate in the Vilnia province (now Lahoysk district in the Minsk region of Belarus), because his family estate in Surviliški was confiscated by the Russian authorities. He created a large library and became an acquaintance and patron of the Belarusian poet Janka Kupała, whose family lived nearby between 1895-1904.

In Czechowicz’ library Kupała got acquainted with proscribed literature (dedicated to the ani-Russian liberation movement) and learned about the January Uprising. The poet later wrote in his autobiographies about his meetings with Czechowicz and their formative influence on him.

== Death and memory ==
Czechowicz died at the age of 76 in Malyja Biasiady on 27 October 1907. He is buried at a cemetery in the town of Radaškavičy.

Czechowicz’ life inspired the Belarusian writer Uładzimier Karatkievič. It is reflected in Karatkievič’s play "The Cradle of the Four Witches", which shows the great formative influence of Czechowicz on young Janka Kupała.

He was twice marred, had one daughter Zofia, and two sons: Zbigniew and Stanisław.
