= Kamei Koreaki =

Japanese photographer

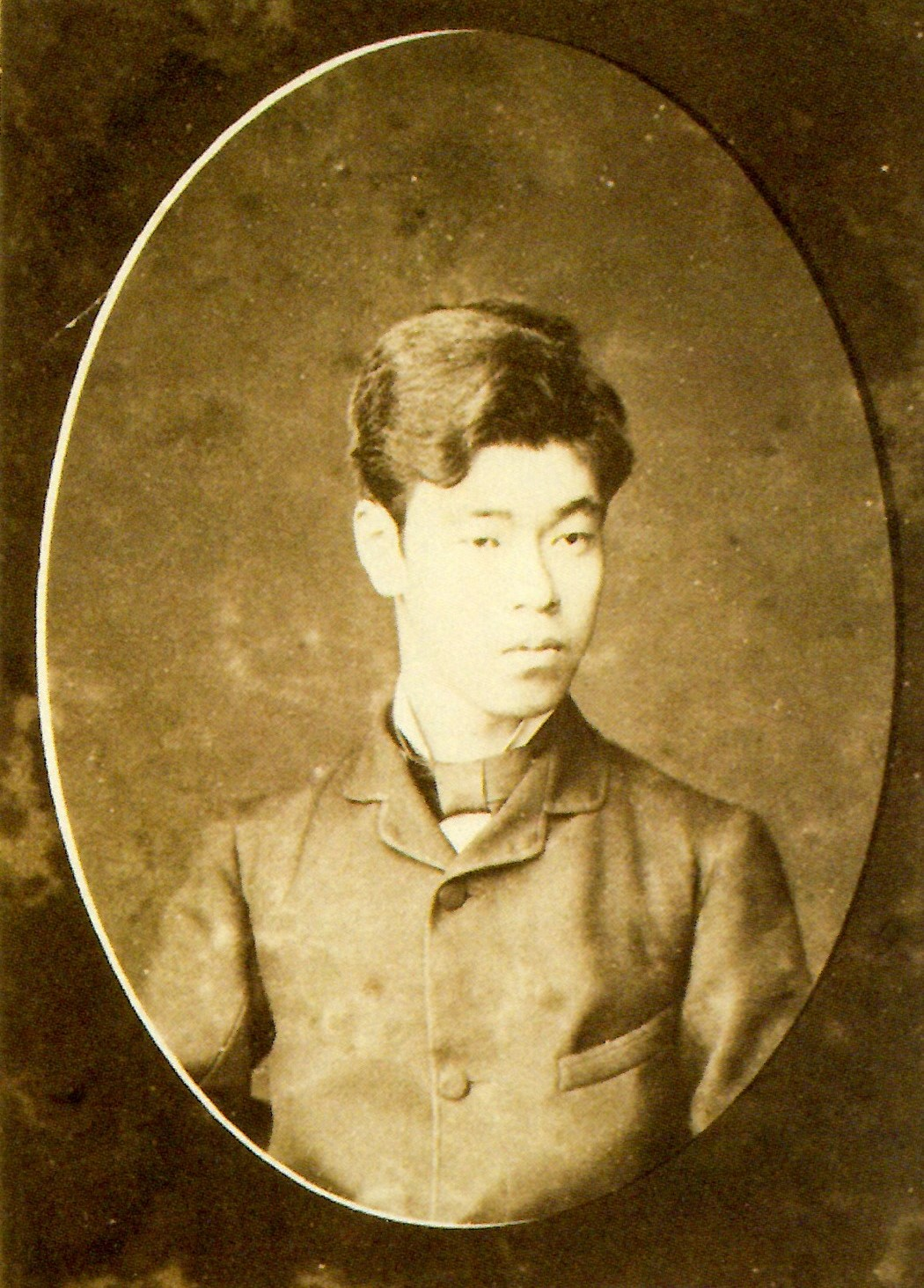
Count Kamei Koreaki

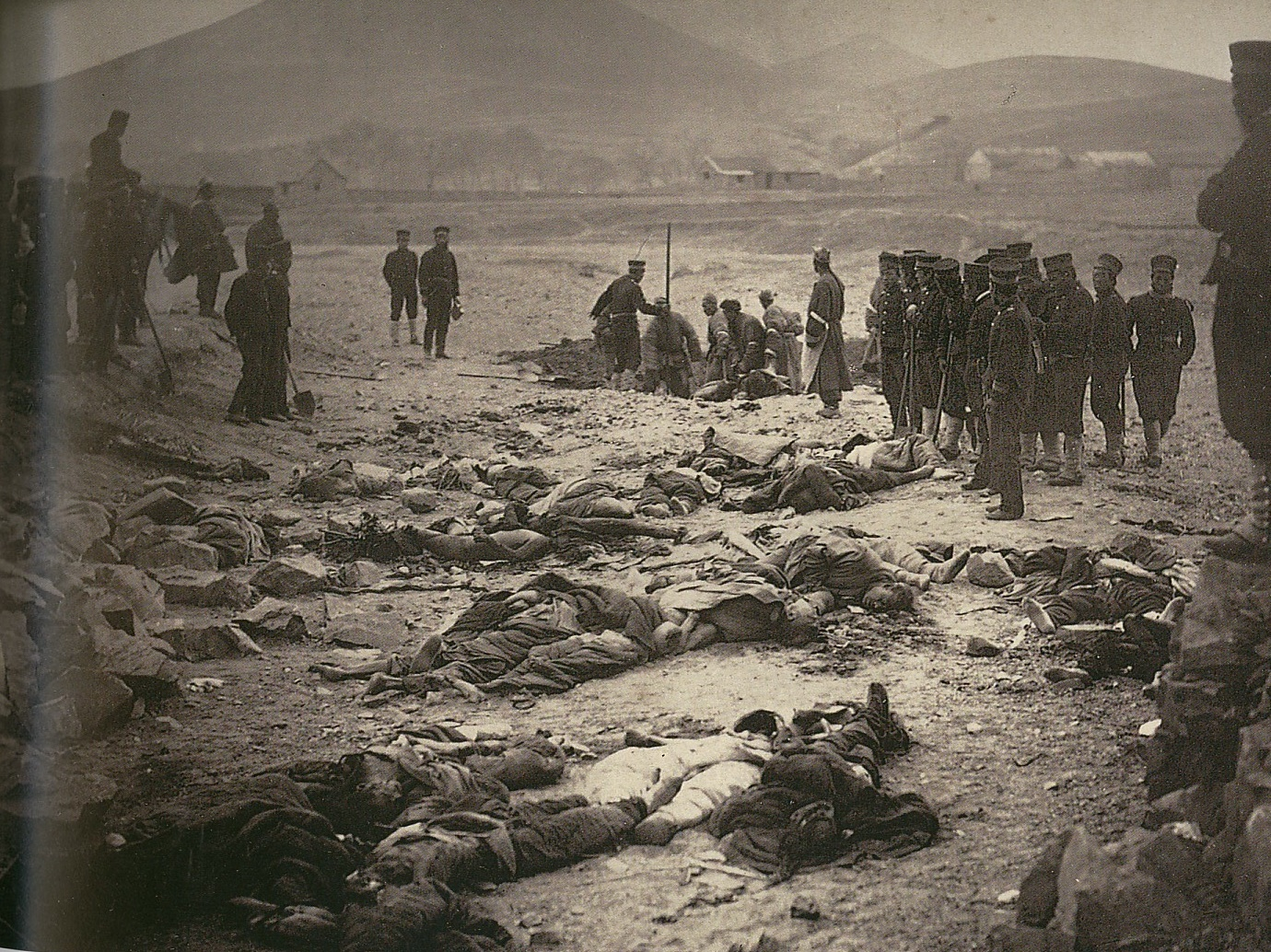
Japanese photographer photographed Japanese army burying the bodies Port Arthur massacre (China)

Kamei Koreaki (亀井 茲明; 22 July 1861 – 18 July 1896) was a Japanese photographer.
