= Tsuwano Domain =

Administrative division in western Japan during the Edo period (1601-1871)

Tsuwano Domain 津和野藩
- Domain of Japan
- 1601–1871
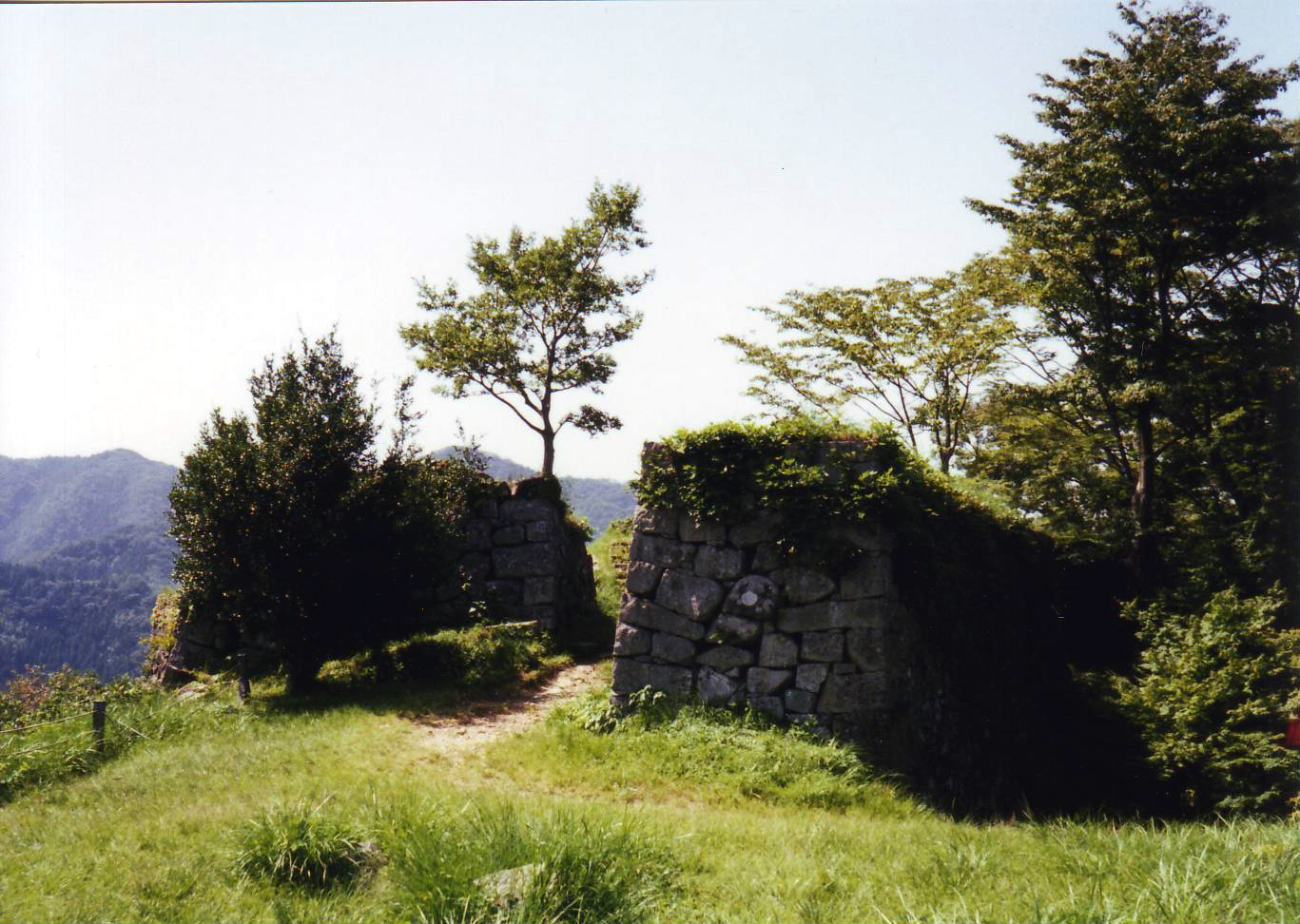
- Ruins of Tsuwano Castle

- Mon of the Kamei clan
- Capital: Tsuwano Castle
- Area
  - Coordinates: 34°27′37″N 131°45′51″E
- Historical era: Edo period
  - Established: 1601
  - Abolition of the han system: 1871
- Contained within
  - Province: Iwami Province
- Today part of: Shimane Prefecture

Location of Tsuwano Castle
Tsuwano Domain (Japan)

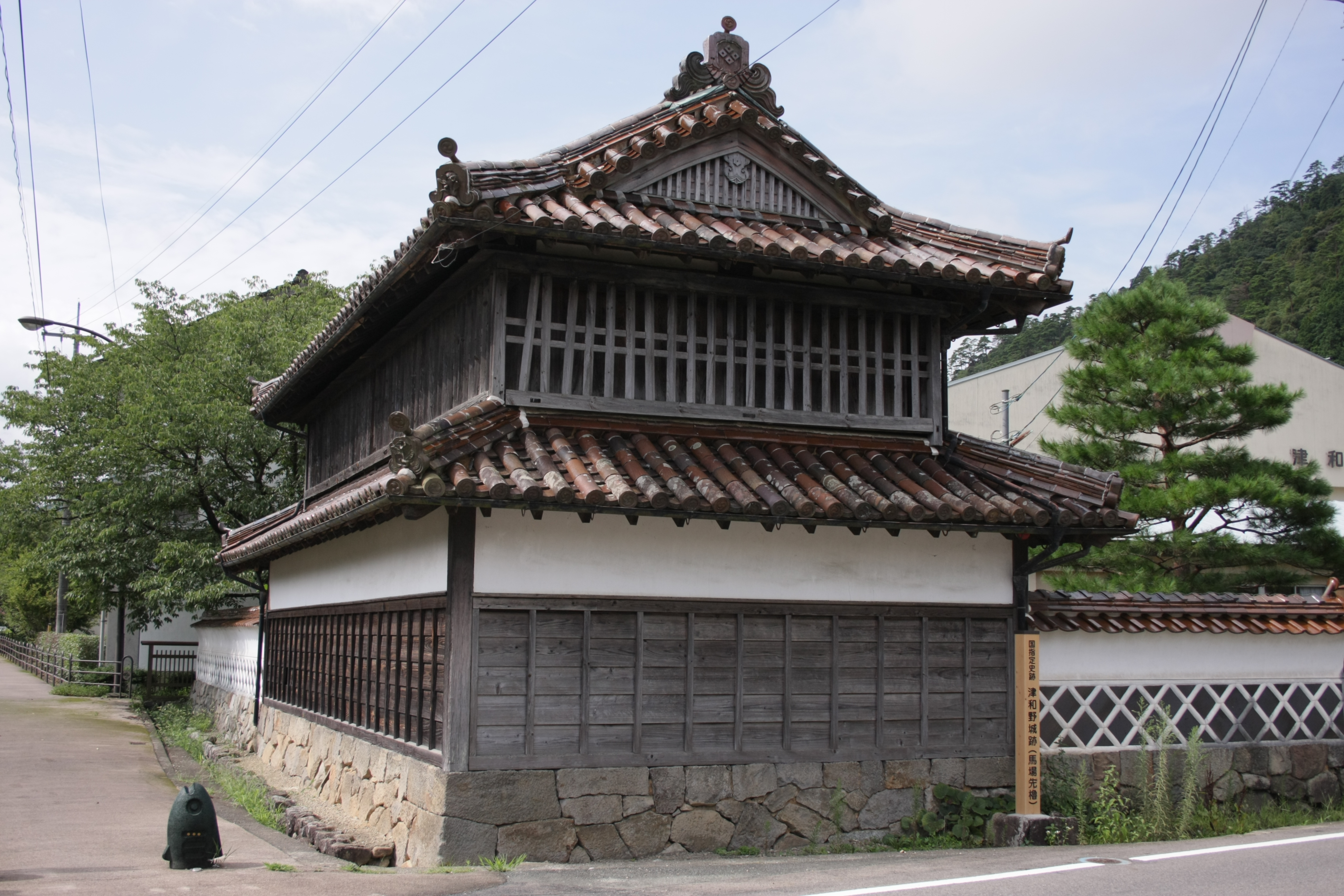
Surviving yagura of Tsuwano Castle

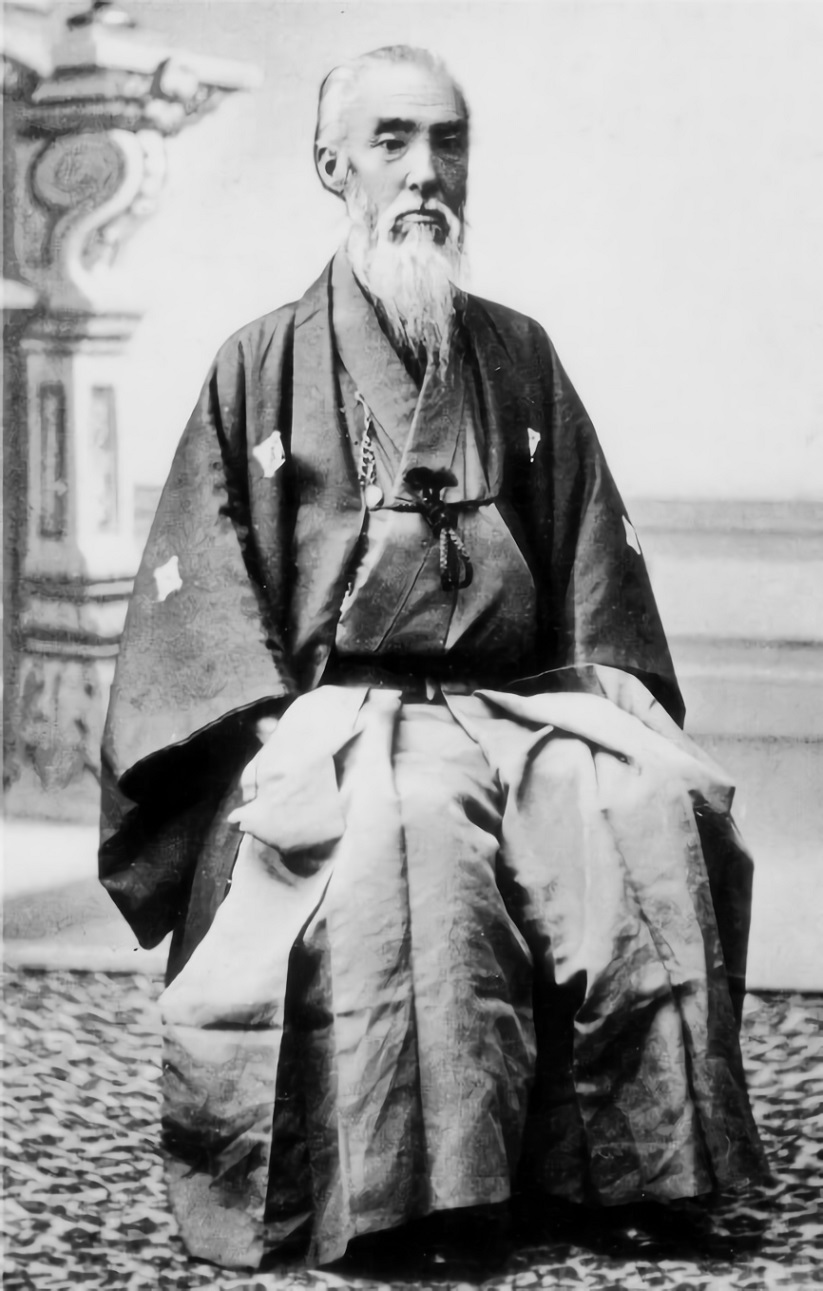
Kamei Koremi, final daimyō of Tsuwano

Tsuwano Domain (津和野藩, Tsuwano-han) was a feudal domain under the Tokugawa shogunate of Edo period Japan, in what is now western Shimane Prefecture. It was centered around Tsuwano Castle and was ruled by the tozama daimyō Kamei clan for most of its history. A number of influential persons in the early Meiji government came from Tsuwano, including Mori Ōgai and Nishi Amane.

== History ==
During the Sengoku period, the area of Tsuwano was ruled by the Yoshimi clan, who served the Ōuchi clan and subsequently the Mōri clan. Following the 1600 Battle of Sekigahara, the Tokugawa shogunate deprived the Mōri of two-thirds of their holdings, reducing the clan to the provinces of Nagato and Suō. Western Iwami became part of the 30,000 koku holdings of Sakazaki Naomori, one of Tokugawa Ieyasu's generals, who established his seat at Tsuwano. Sakazaki laid the foundations of the domain by building a castle town, conducting land surveys, and making major renovations to the castle. In 1616, Sakazaki was either killed or committed seppuku over the "Senhime incident". He had been promised Ieyasu's daughter Senhime as his wife if he rescued her from Osaka Castle during the Siege of Osaka; however, afterwards Ieyasu gave her to Honda Takatoki instead. The incensed Sakazaki plotted to kidnap her, but the plot was discovered by the shogunate and the Sakazaki clan was destroyed.

In 1617, the shogunate awarded the domain to Kamei Masanori with an increase in kokudaka to 43,000 koku. His descendants would continue to rule the domain until the Meiji restoration. Kamei Masanori was highly trusted by the shogunate, and there was talk of his transfer to Himeji Domain for a time, but he suddenly died in 1619. His son Kamei Masanori succeeded him at a young age, resulting in a succession dispute in 1635, but under the initiative of his karō, Tago Masakiyo, he managed the internal strife. Since the sea route to Osaka was used by the domain for its sankin kōtai route to Edo, he negotiated an agreement with Hiroshima Domain which allowed Tsuwano to have its own exclave on the coast of the Seto Inland Sea to maintain a dock and warehouse. Through the middle of the Edo period, the clan's finances were prosperous, with washi paper being monopolized and new rice fields developed. However, in the late Edo period, natural disasters and poor harvests continued, and the finances deteriorated. Under such circumstances, the eighth daimyō, Kamei Norikata, founded the domain academy "Yorokan". The last daimyō, Kamei Koremi, carried out domain administrative reforms and appointed talented personnel. He also believed in Shintoism and devoted himself to the development of Kokugaku. Although Tsuwano was a neighbor of Chōshū Domain, it maintained a policy of neutrality in its conflict with the shogunate. However, many retainers of Tsuwano Domain joined the sonnō jōi movement, and after the Meiji Restoration many of these people joined the new Meiji government. During the Second Chōshū expedition, the high-handed behavior of the shogunate forces in the domain caused a change in policy, and after the shogunate army withdrew, Koremi had the metsuke whom the shogunate left behind to ensure his loyalty arrested and turned over to Chōshū. After that, he actively showed allegiance to the new government, and held numerous high administrative posts related to religion.

In July 1871, just prior to the abolition of the han system by imperial edict, Kamei Koremi voluntarily ordered the destruction of Tsuwano Castle, resigned from the post of imperial governor and asked that the domain be dissolved. After that, it was incorporated into Shimane Prefecture after merging with Hamada Prefecture.

== Holdings at the end of the Edo period ==
As with most domains in the han system, Tsuwano Domain consisted of several discontinuous territories calculated to provide the assigned kokudaka, based on periodic cadastral surveys and projected agricultural yields, g.

- Iwami Province
  - 2 villages in Ōchi District
  - 26 villages in Naka District
  - 46 villages in Mino District
  - 56 villages in Kanoashi District

== List of daimyō ==
#	Name	Tenure	Courtesy title	Court Rank	kokudaka
Sakazaki clan, 1601-1616 (Tozama)
1	Sakazaki Naomori (坂崎直盛)	1601 - 1616	Tsushima-no-kami (対馬守	Junior 5th Rank, Lower Grade (従五位下)	30,000 -> 40,000 koku
Kamei clan, 1617-1871 (Tozama)
1	Kamei Masanori (亀井政矩)	1617 - 1619	Buzen-no-kami (豊前守)	Junior 5th Rank, Lower Grade (従五位下)	45,000 koku
2	Kamei Koremasa (亀井茲政)	1619 - 1680	Buzen-no-kami (豊前守)	Junior 5th Rank, Lower Grade (従五位下)	45,000 koku
3	Kamei Korechika (亀井茲親)	1680 - 1731	Oki-no-kami (隠岐守)	Junior 5th Rank, Lower Grade (従五位下)	45,000 koku
4	Kamei Koremitsu (亀井茲満)	1731 - 1736	Inaba-no-kami (因幡守)	Junior 5th Rank, Lower Grade (従五位下)	45,000 koku
5	Kamei Korenobu (亀井茲延)	1736 - 1743	Buzen-no-kami (豊前守)	Junior 5th Rank, Lower Grade (従五位下)	45,000 koku
6	Kamei Koretane (亀井茲胤)	1743 - 1752	Shinano-no-kami (信濃守)	Junior 5th Rank, Lower Grade (従五位下)	45,000 koku
7	Kamei Norisada (亀井矩貞)	1752 - 1783	Noto-no-kami (能登守)	Junior 5th Rank, Lower Grade (従五位下)	45,000 koku
8	Kamei Norikata (亀井矩賢)	1783 - 1819	Oki-no-kami (隠岐守)	Junior 5th Rank, Lower Grade (従五位下)	45,000 koku
9	Kamei Korenao (亀井茲尚)	1819 - 1830	Osumi-no-kami (大隅守)	Junior 5th Rank, Lower Grade (従五位下)	45,000 koku
10	Kamei Korekata (亀井茲方)	1831 - 1839	Noto-no-kami (能登守)	Junior 5th Rank, Lower Grade (従五位下)	45,000 koku
11	Kamei Koremi (亀井茲監)	1839 - 1871	Oki-no-kami (隠岐守); Jijū (侍従)	Junior 4th Rank, Lower Grade (従四位下)	45,000 koku

== See also ==
- List of Han
- Abolition of the han system
