= Kamei Masanori =

Japanese daimyō

Kamei Masanori (亀井 政矩; December 25, 1590 – September 22, 1619) was a Japanese daimyō of the early Edo period. He was the head of the Tsuwano Domain.

== Early life ==
Masanori was the son of Kamei Korenori.

Masanori's early service began under Tokugawa Ieyasu in 1602, and in 1604 he was assigned as an attendant to Ieyasu's son Hidetada. His childhood name was Daishomaru (大小丸).

== Family ==
- Father: Kamei Korenori
- Mother: Tago Shigemori's daughter
- Wife: Kōmyōin
- Children:
  - Kamei Tsunenori
  - Kunimatsu
  - daughter married Tsuzuki Shigetsune
  - Kamei Koremasa by Kōmyōin

== Daimyo ==
Upon the death of his father, Masanori inherited Shikano Domain.

Masanori was transferred to Tsuwano Domain in 1617. His descendants continued to live at Tsuwano in Iwami Province.

Preceded by Kamei Korenori	2nd Daimyō of Shikano (Kamei); 1612–1617	Succeeded by Ikeda Nakasumi
Preceded by Sakazaki Naomori	1st Daimyō of Tsuwano (Kamei); 1617–1619	Succeeded by Kamei Koremasa
