= Kamei Koremasa =

Daimyo

Kamei Koremasa (亀井 茲政; 1617 – February 6, 1681) was a Japanese daimyō of the early Edo period, who ruled the Tsuwano Domain. He assisted in the construction of a part of Kōdaiji Temple in Kyoto. His childhood name was Dairiki (大力).

== Family ==
- Father: Kamei Masanori
- Mother: Kōmyōin
- Wife: Tōsen-in
- Concubine: Mizusaki Hōan’s daughter
- Children:
  - Kamei Masanao (1645-1679) by Tōsen-in
  - Kamei Koretsugu
  - daughter married Matsudaira Yasutomi
  - daughter married Shimazu Tadataka
  - daughter married Namba Munekazu
  - daughter married Washo Masatoki
  - Kamei Korechika (1669-1731) by Mizusaki Hōan’s daughter
  - Kamei Masasuke
  - Munekiyo Sōjō
  - Tago Masazumi
  - daughter married Morikawa Toshitane
  - daughter married Itakura Shigehiro
  - daughter married Yagyū Toshikata
  - Kamei Noriyuki

Preceded by Kamei Masanori	2nd Daimyō of Tsuwano (Kamei); 1619–1680	Succeeded by Kamei Korechika
