= Sakazaki Naomori =

Japanese daimyō

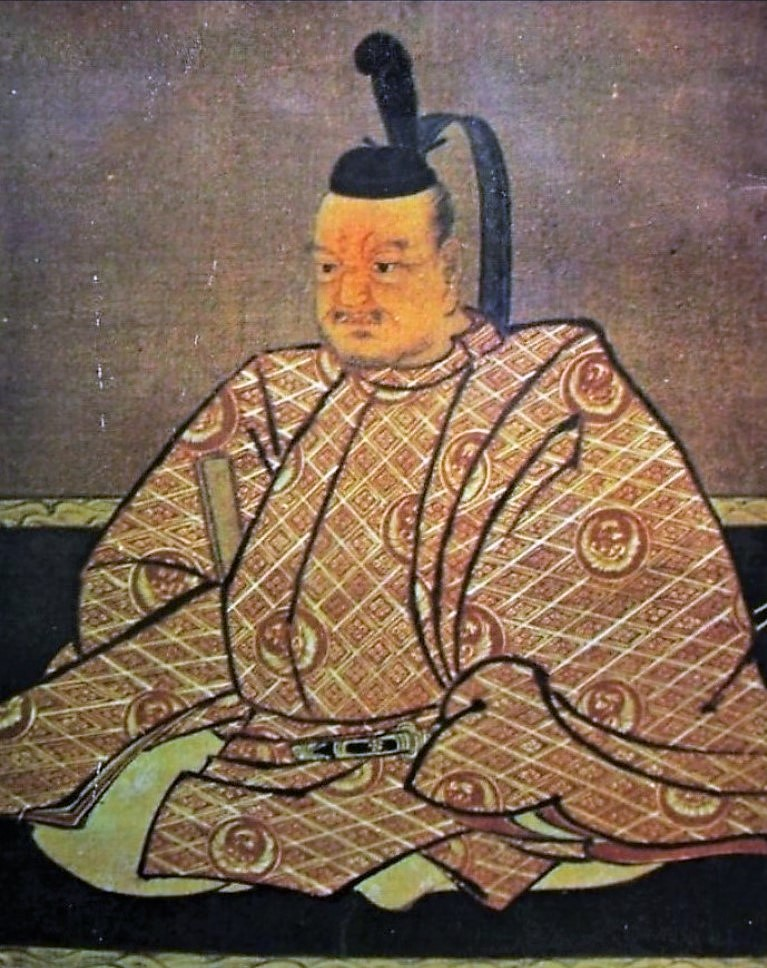
Sakazaki Naomori

Sakazaki Naomori (坂崎直盛) (1563 – October 21, 1616) was a Japanese daimyō of the early Edo period, who served as lord of the Tsuwano Domain. Originally called Ukita Akiie (宇喜多 詮家) he first served his uncle Ukita Naoie and then his son Ukita Hideie. He took part in the attack against the Uesugi of Aizu, and later in the Sekigahara campaign he left Ukita's Western army and joined Tokugawa's Eastern army. After the war, he was given lordship of the Tsuwano domain. Tokugawa Ieyasu also gave him a new name Sakazaki (坂崎).

Preceded by none	Daimyō of Tsuwano; 1601–1616	Succeeded by Kamei Masanori
