= Pastavy district =

District of Vitebsk region, Belarus

Pastavy district Пастаўскі раён (Belarusian)
- District
- Flag Coat of arms

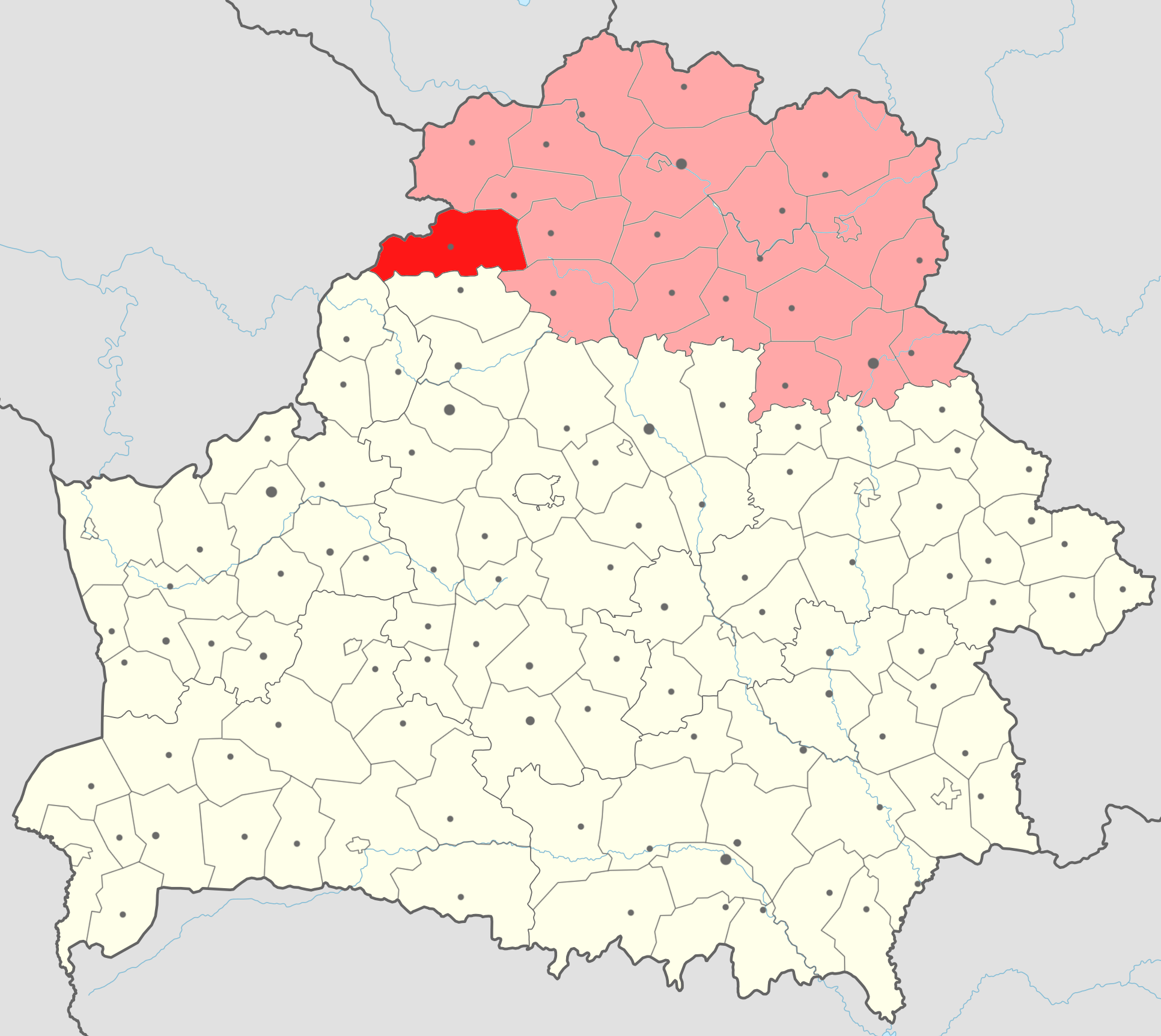
- Coordinates: 55°7′N 26°50′E
- Country: Belarus
- Region: Vitebsk region
- Administrative center: Pastavy

Area
  - Total: 2,096.44 km^{2} (809.44 sq mi)
- Elevation: 166 m (545 ft)

Population (2023)
  - Total: 32,402
  - Density: 15.456/km^{2} (40.030/sq mi)
- Time zone: UTC+3 (MSK)

Pastavy district (Belarusian: Пастаўскі раён; Russian: Поставский район) is a district (raion) of Vitebsk region in Belarus. The administrative center is the town of Pastavy.

== Notable residents ==
- Zyhmunt Čachovič (1831 – 1907), one of the leaders of the 1863-1864 January Uprising
- Uladzimir Dubouka (1900 – 1976), Belarusian poet, writer and a Gulag prisoner
