= Hans Auer =

Swiss-Austrian architect (1847–1906)

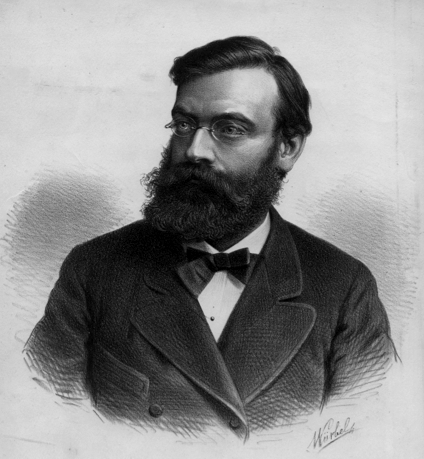
Franz Würbel, Hans Auer (Vienna, c. 1885) — Private Collection (Yarmouth Port, MA).

Hans Wilhelm Auer (26 April 1847 – 30 August 1906) was a Swiss-Austrian architect best known for his design of the Swiss Bundeshaus (1894–1902) in Bern.

Auer was born in Wädenswil. A pupil first of Gottfried Semper at the ETH Zurich and then staff assistant for Theophil Hansen in Vienna, Auer established his own office in 1887 and enjoyed a rich and varied career as a practicing architect, educator, and theorist. He died at Konstanz.

Like his near-contemporary Constantin Lipsius, Auer was an eloquent advocate for architectural realism, a sophisticated theoretical stance that became increasingly significant in the 1880s on the continent. Architectural Realists sought to renew contemporary architecture through thoughtful reconsideration of the symbolic properties of the classical language of architectural expression; this "realistic" reconsideration required a new level of archaeological accuracy in the understanding of the emergence and evolution of specific forms. Auer's brilliant historical discussion of the triglyph (1880) comprised the basis for his own reflections on improving the existing state of contemporary architecture. Architectural realism enabled Auer's generation to disengage from slavish imitation of historical forms and hastened the emergence of more subtle perspectives on stylistic innovation. Auer's unique contribution as an architectural theorist was to expand the notion of architectural space as a significant aspect of style and evolution (1883), an accomplishment that is usually consigned to the art historian August Schmarsow (1893).

What we now regard as "high modernist" architectural theory was achieved by the next generation (largely born during the final quarter of the 19th century), although many of its conceptual foundations were grasped by the Architectural Realists of the 1880s.
