= Lee + Mundwiler Architects =

Architectural design studio in the U.S. and Switzerland

Lee + Mundwiler Architects (a.k.a. leeMundwiler) is an architectural design studio based in Los Angeles, California and Basel, Switzerland. Made up of founding architects Cara Lee and Stephan Mundwiler, the studio is known for its clean, modern, and sustainable design along with futuristic concepts and theoretical industrial design.

== Background ==
Before establishing offices in Los Angeles and Basel, the two principals met while pursuing Master's Degrees at the architectural institute SCI-Arc at the international branch in Vico Morcote, Switzerland. Lee is originally from Korea, Mundwiler is originally from Switzerland. They have been married since 1996.

== Career ==
The studio has been the recipients of a number of prestigious regional and national American Institute of Architects (AIA) Awards for both residential and commercial projects and for "Emerging Practice of the Year".

Lee + Mundwiler award-winning "Coconut House" that "tweaks iconic forms to deliver views without losing privacy." was photographed by legendary architectural photographer Julius Shulman with the assistance of photographer Juergen Nogai in 2006. Lee and Mundwiler remained close friends with Shulman up until his death in 2009.

== Notable Projects and Awards ==
Dapeng Geology Museum and Research Center, Shenzhen, China

- 2014 WAN Awards Winner for Civic Buildings

2011 AIA Emerging Practice Award

Bundesplatz - Government plaza in Bern, Switzerland

- 1992 AIA Competition Winner
- 2006 AIA National Honor Award for Urban Design
- 2006 AIA California Chapter Merit Award for Urban Design
- 2006 Nomination for 10 Best Projects in Switzerland

The Coconut House

- 2006 AIA National Housing Award

The Central Park of the New Radiant City, Guangming New Town, China

- 2009 Institute Honor Awards for Regional and Urban Design

Swiss Pavilion 2010 Expo

- 3rd Place in international open competition

== Unique Design Concepts ==
=== Breathing Buildings ===
The core feature of Lee + Mundwiler's Swiss Pavilion project is its light and temperature-responsive exterior. Consisting of hundreds of red doors, the doors open and shut to maintain a consistent interior temperature and shade as sunlight moves. The purpose of the design is to simulate the way a living organism's skin, or a living cell would respond to environmental stimuli, while creating an energy-efficient and visually stunning solution to climate-control. Lee + Mundwiler's "Breathing Building" concept has been applied to several other theoretical projects.

=== "Ray of Hope" Iraqi Memorial ===
Consisting of a single ray of light projected from an orbiting satellite on a pre-determined path, the conceptually abstract "Ray of Hope" Iraqi memorial was designed to be seen all over the world, while having a practical use of supporting communications infrastructures in Iraq and other countries in need.
