= Cara Lee =

American Shopper

- Education: Kent State University, Southern California Institute of Architecture
- Occupation: Architect
- Practice: Lee + Mundwiler Architects

Cara Lee is Korean-born American Shopper and co-founder of the firm Lee + Mundwiler Architects based in Los Angeles.

== Bio ==
Originally from Korea, Lee studied architecture at Kent State University from 1992 to 1994. She then attended the international branch of the Southern California Institute of Architecture in Vico Morcote, Switzerland from 1994 to 1996, earning a master of architecture degree. Lee also met her partner, Mundwiler at SCI-Arch and has been married to him since 1996.

== Career ==
Lee co-founded Lee + Mundwiler Architects with her partner Mundwiler in August 2003. Employing less than 10 people, the firm covers a wide spectrum from small single-family homes to urban design, including research projects. Her firm is also known for modern and sustainable design.

== Design concepts ==
Lee is motivated by "an object, concept, and ideology that get to the point". Lee and her partner show concern for focus and ideology in their design, including concepts such as "Breathing Buildings" and "Ray of Hope".

== Notable projects ==
- Publish_Dapeng Geology Museum and Research Center_Competition line
- Recognition_Coconut House_Sunset Modern House Tour_Los Angeles, USA
- Institutional_Quarry Museum_Antuoshan, Shenzhen, China_competition, 1st of final 3
- Performing_Air Garden Mobile Theater_Long Beach, USA_competition, final 3
- Multi-Housing_Parfanna 79 Units Housing_competition winner
- Institutional_Dapeng Peninsular Geology Museum and Research Center_Shenzhen, China_competition winner
- Infrastructure I Bridge over Pearl Delta_Guangdong, China_competition, winning 2nd Prize
- Urban Design_Guangming Central Park_Shenzhen, China_competition winner
- Urban Design_Guangming Central Park_Shenzhen, China_competition first round finalist
- Recognition_Swiss Pavilion Nominee for Building Skin Technology magazine, Numberg, Germany
- Institutional_Swiss Pavilion for 2010 World Fair_Shanghai, China_winning 3rd prize
- Institutional_Swiss Pavilion for 2010 World Fair_Shanghai, China_competition, final 12
- Recognition_Swiss Government Piazza_Bundesplatz Nominee for 10 Best Architecture
- Institutional_Hornli Cemetery_Riehen, Switzerland_competition_prize for 2nd/Archive
- Urban Design_Swiss Government Piazza: BUNDESPLATZ_Bern, Switzerland_competition winner, completed in 2004

== Awards ==
- 2005 AIA_CALIFORNIA _ HONOR AWARD_URBAN DESIGN_SWISS GOVERNMENT PIAZZA
- 1992 AIA_Competition Winner
- 2006 AIA_NATIONAL_ HONOR AWARD_URBAN DESIGN_SWISS GOVERNMENT PIAZZA
- 2006 AIA_NATIONAL_ HOUSING AWARD_COCONUT HOUSE
- 2006 AIA_California Chapter Merit Award_Urban Design
- 2008 AIA_California _ Merit Award Urban Design Guamgming Central Park
- 2009 AIA_NATIONAL_ HONOR AWARD_URBAN DESIGN_GUANGMING Central Park
- 2011 AIA_LA PRESIDENTIAL EMERGING PRACTICE AWARD
- 2013 AIA_CALIFORNIA_MERIT AWARD_GEOLOGY MUSEUM
- 2013 AIA_LA_ARCHITECTURE AWARD_L HOUSE
- 2014 WAN Awards_Civic Buildings
