= History of the Jews in Bern =

The history of the Jews in Bern dates back to at least the Middle Ages. Following the expulsion and persecution of Jews during and after the Black Death epidemic, few Jews were able to live or work in the canton until the 19th century. The Jewish community of Bern (Jüdische Gemeinde Bern) was founded in 1948 and is active to this day.

== The Middle Ages ==
The first mention of Jews in Bern was in 1259. The presence of a synagogue, cemetery and Jewish quarter testifies to a thriving Jewish community. The Judengasse (Jewish quarter) was located next to the Inselkloster in today's Kochergasse. The synagogue and Judentor stood on the grounds of the Bundeshaus and in front of its main entrance, respectively. The cemetery was sold around 1323; two medieval gravestones have survived. The Jewish quarter was covered by new buildings in 1901, and partially excavated in 2003. Predominantly poor, the medieval Jews of Bern engaged in money-lending, pawnbroking, cattle trading and used-goods trading. Some achieved recognition as doctors. Letters of protection regulated the conditions of residence, taxes, occupation, and religious practice. In 1294 the small community was persecuted and expelled after the accusation of ritual murder of the child, Rudolf of Bern (who was honoured in Bern Cathedral as a martyr).

The outbreak of the Black Death in 1348 triggered a multitude of anti-Jewish pogroms across Europe. Bern played a central role in passing on rumours of well-poisoning from francophone to German-speaking Switzerland. Despite violent murders and persecutions from 1348-1350, the Jews returned to Bern in 1375. Further expulsions took place in 1392 and 1427 after anti-Jewish agitation by the chronicler Konrad Justinger. Until 1798, only Jewish travelling merchants and doctors were allowed to stay in the city.

== 17th and 18th centuries ==
Little is known about Judaism in Bern in the 17th and 18th centuries. In 1648, the city sent out a directive to its Aargau officials, demanding the expulsion of the Jews and threatening those who tolerated them with a fine of 100 gulden. Only a few weeks later, on request of the Jews, this demand was mitigated, and Jews were given permission to travel freely and attend the markets and fairs in the region.

In 1787, the Jews of Bern were once again expelled, and the city council banned all trade with them. They were also prohibited from sojourning in the county. This ban included the Surbtal Jews, who were under the protection of Baden.

== 19th century ==
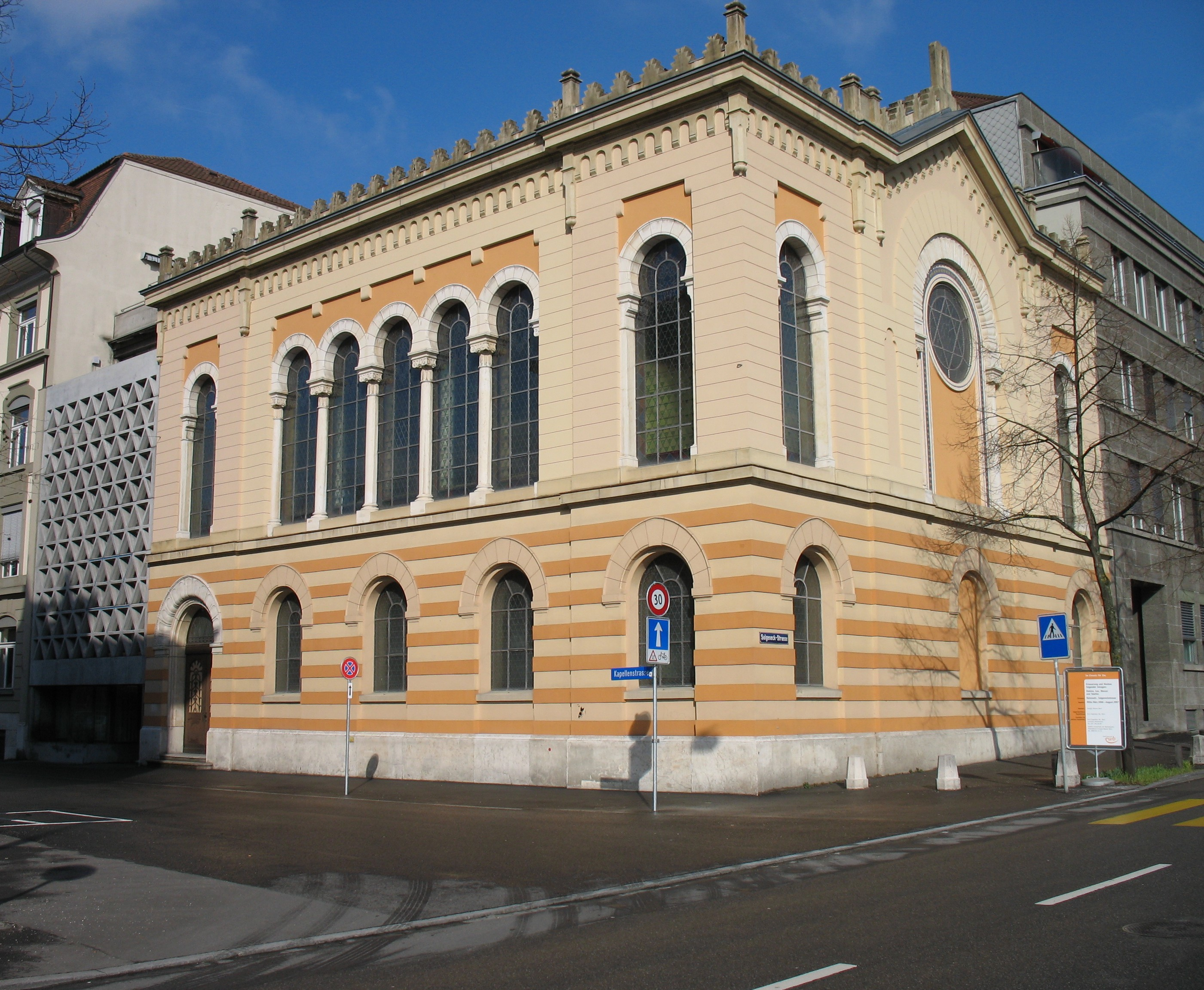
Synagogue of Bern, inaugurated in 1906

In the early 19th century, individual Jews were able to settle in Bern, but freedom of settlement was not established in the region until 1846. Shortly afterwards, in 1848, Alsatian Jews founded the "Corporation of Israelites of the City of Bern", later renamed Jüdische Gemeinde Bern (Jewish Community of Bern). From 1856, the terraced house "Hinter den Speichern" on Anatomiegasse, (today's Genfergasse) served as the synagogue. The rabbi of Hegenheim attended to the congregation, and the dead were also buried there. In 1871, the modern cemetery was established on Papiermühlestrasse, and in 1906, the community inaugurated its Moorish-Oriental synagogue on the corner of Kapellenstrasse and Sulgeneckstrasse. For some 30 years, there was a separate East European Jewish community.

== 20th century ==
Around 1910 the Jewish community numbered about 1,000 members. Many had immigrated from Eastern Europe, among them Russian students. The most famous Jewish student from Russia was Anna Tumarkin, who later became the first woman professor at the University of Bern, and the first woman to sit as a member of a University Senate in Europe. Bern’s most important contribution to science, Albert Einstein’s theory of relativity, was penned from Gerechtigkeitsgasse, Einstein’s home in the old city of Bern, just a stone’s throw from the old clock, Zytglogge. The apartment is a museum today, and the Bern Historical Museum has a permanent exhibition on Albert Einstein.

In 1933, the Swiss Jewish Association and the Jewish Community of Bern sued the far-right National Front for distributing antisemitic propaganda, including The Protocols of the Elders of Zion. The plaintiffs won the ensuing court case, the so-called Bern Trial, and the presiding judge declared the Protocols a forgery.

During the Second World War, a group of Jewish helpers together with Polish diplomats operated in secret to save the lives of hundreds of Jews by means of forged Latin American papers and letters of protection, in what would later become known as “the Bern Group”.

In Bern, it was not until 1995 that the canton recognized the Jewish religious community under public law, thus giving it the same status as the national churches. The community has around 340 members. According to its mission statement, the Jüdische Gemeinde Bern is "open and tolerant towards all Jewish religious orientations".

== See also ==
- History of the Jews in Switzerland
- Ładoś Group
