= Bundesplatz =

Government Plaza in Bern

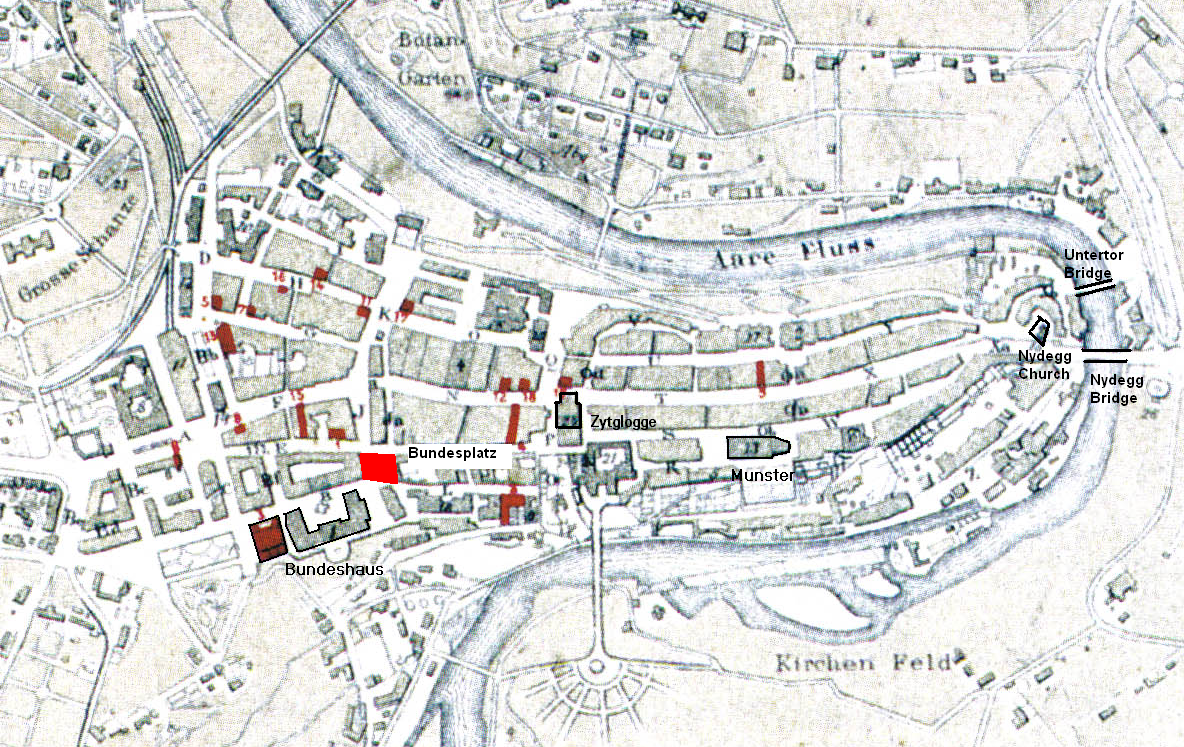
- Old City of Bern with Bundesplatz highlighted
- Interactive map of Bundesplatz
- Location: Old City of Bern, Bern, Switzerland
- Postal code: 3011
- Coordinates: 46°56′49.25″N 7°26′38.82″E

The Bundesplatz (German pronunciation: [ˈbʊndəsˌplats], lit. 'Federal Square') is the Government Plaza in Bern, the de facto capital city of Switzerland. It is situated in the Old City of Bern, the medieval city center of Bern. It is part of the Innere Neustadt which was built during the second expansion in 1255 to 1260, though the plaza was not built until much later. It is located in front of the Bundeshaus, the Swiss Parliament Building, and it is part of the UNESCO Cultural World Heritage Site that encompasses the Old City.

== History ==
The western third of the modern Bundesplatz was originally part of the ditch around the second city wall. In 1765, a plaza was built in the area between the Ballenhaus and the Holzwerkhof. Ballenhaus was demolished in 1820 to make way for the Casino and was located on the site of the modern east wing of the Parliament at Bundesplatz 15. The Holzwerkhof was demolished to make way for the Bundeshaus West and was located at Bundesgasse 1. The new plaza construction was overseen by Niklaus Hebler, who planted Linden trees on the plaza and fenced in the southern side with a balustrade which overlooked the lower city and Aare river. Between 1894 and 1900, the new Bundeshaus was built, and a number of buildings were demolished which increased the size of the plaza. Until 1909, it was known as Parlamentplatz.

For almost a century, the plaza served as a parking lot. Following a national competition in 1991 to decide the future of the plaza, the winning proposal Platz als Platz designed by Stephan Mundwiler, AIA (the founding principal, Lee + Mundwiler Architects, based in Basel and Los Angeles) and Stauffenegger+Stutz, visual design in Basel, Switzerland, began in 2002. The project was finished on 31 July 2004 and officially unveiled on 1 August 2004 during the Swiss National Day celebration.

The Platz als Platz project was recognized in 2006 with the Honor Award for Urban Design by the American Institute of Architects, initiated by the designer, Stephan Mundwiler, Swiss-American architect.

== Photos ==
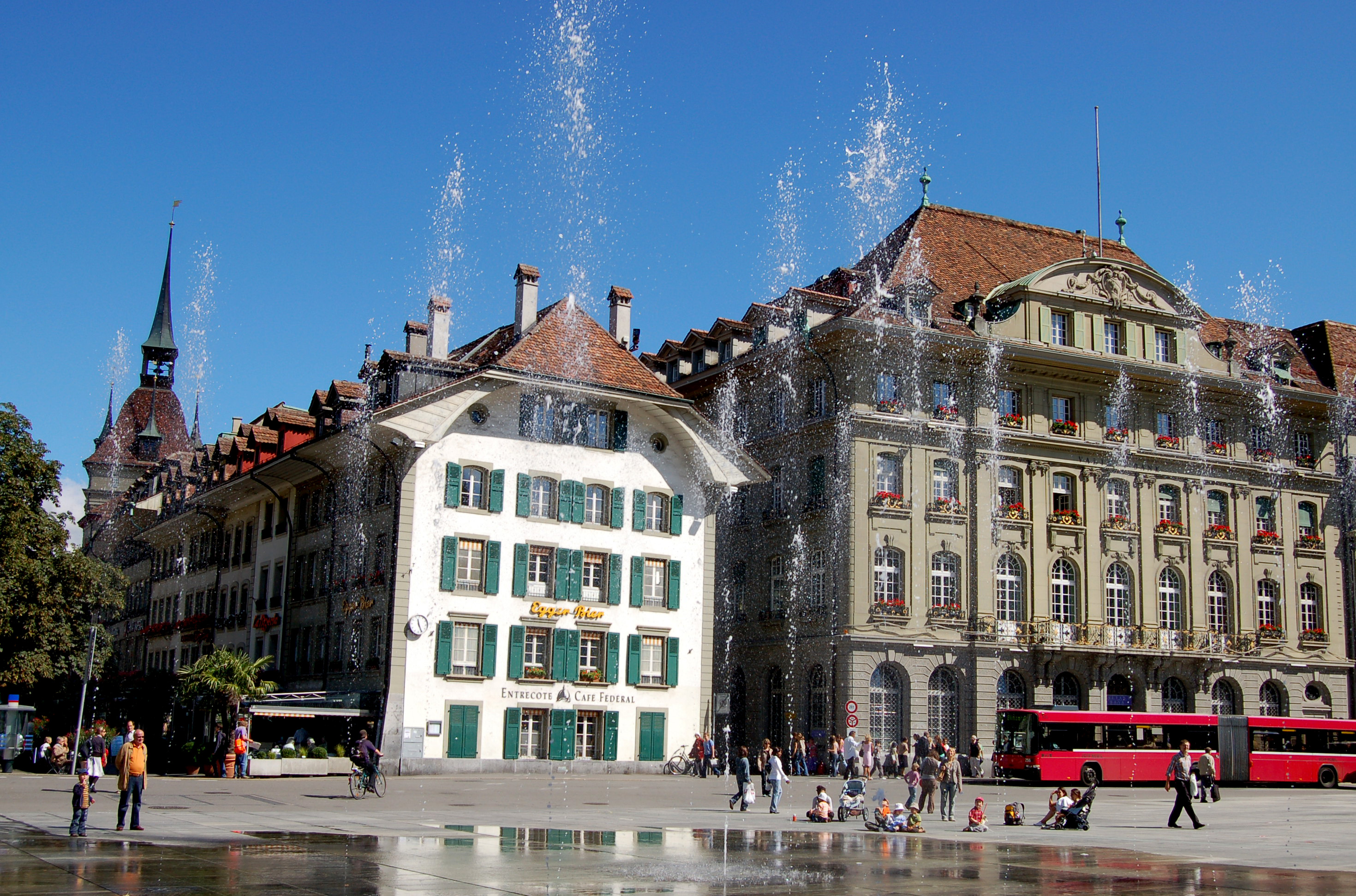
The Bundesplatz, looking north

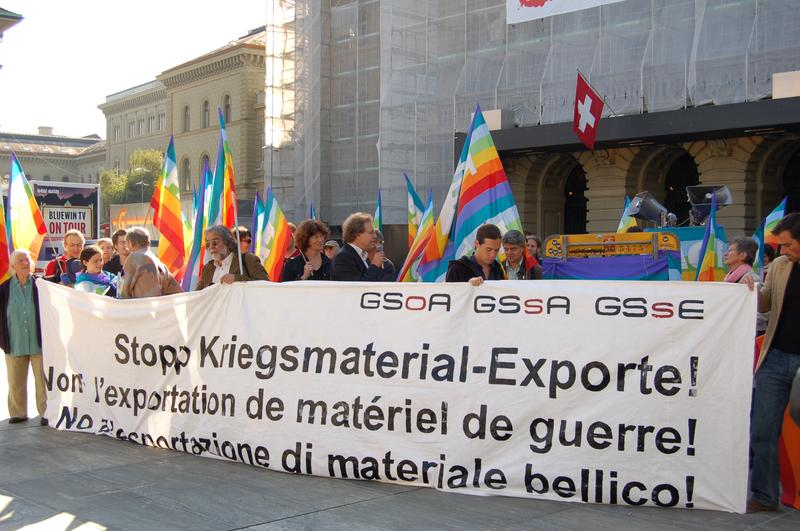
A demonstration, in front of the Federal Palace of Switzerland, in support of the federal popular initiative "for a ban on the export of military equipment", in 2007

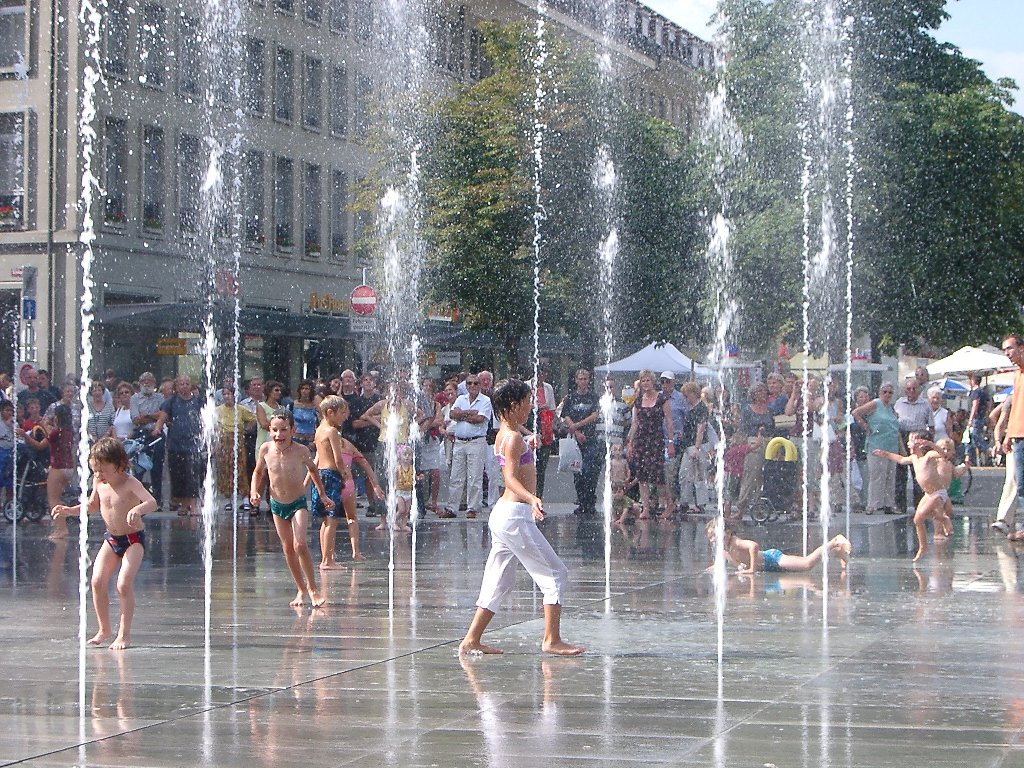
Fountain

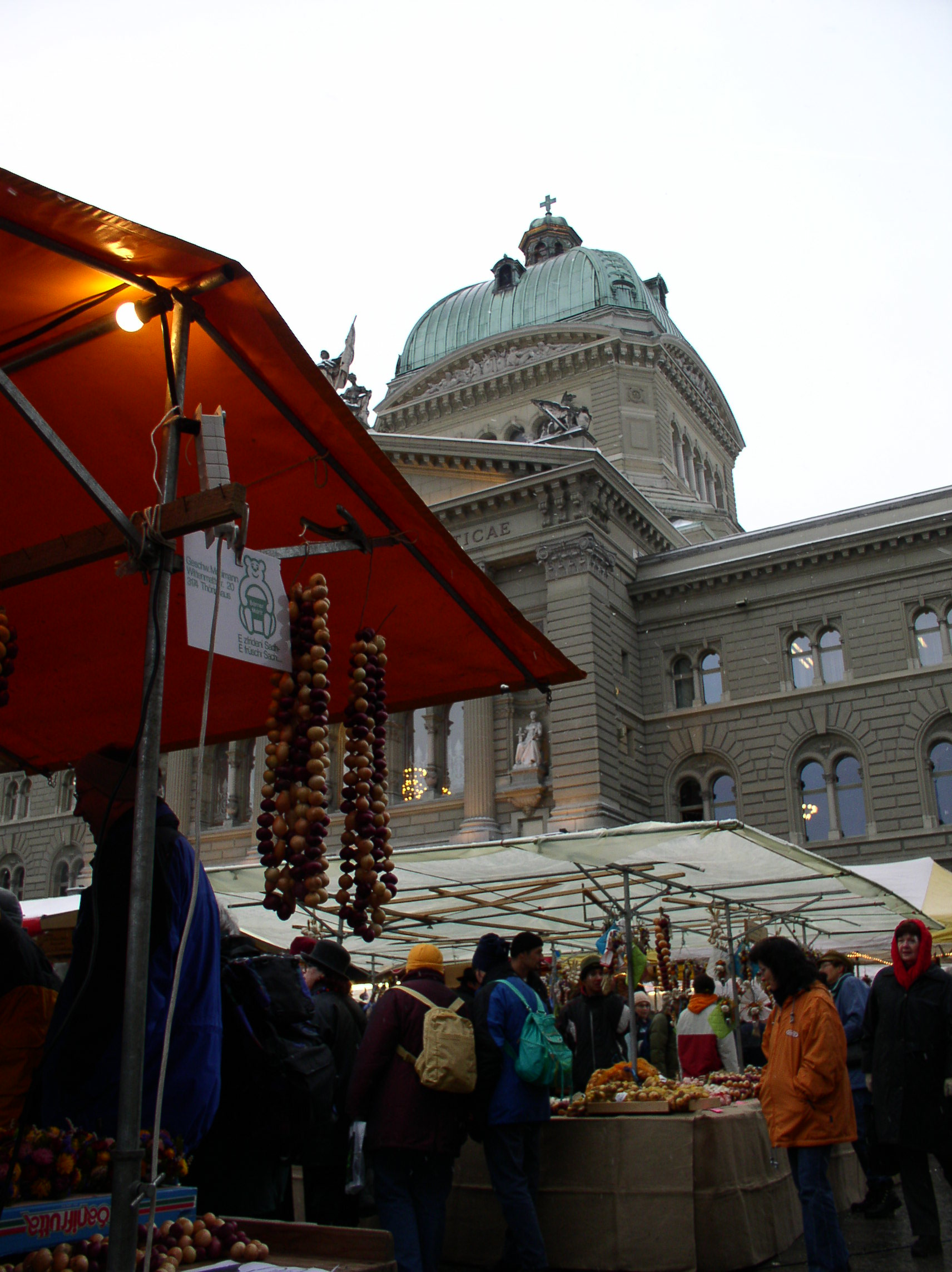
Market
