= Kochergasse =

Street in the Old City of Bern

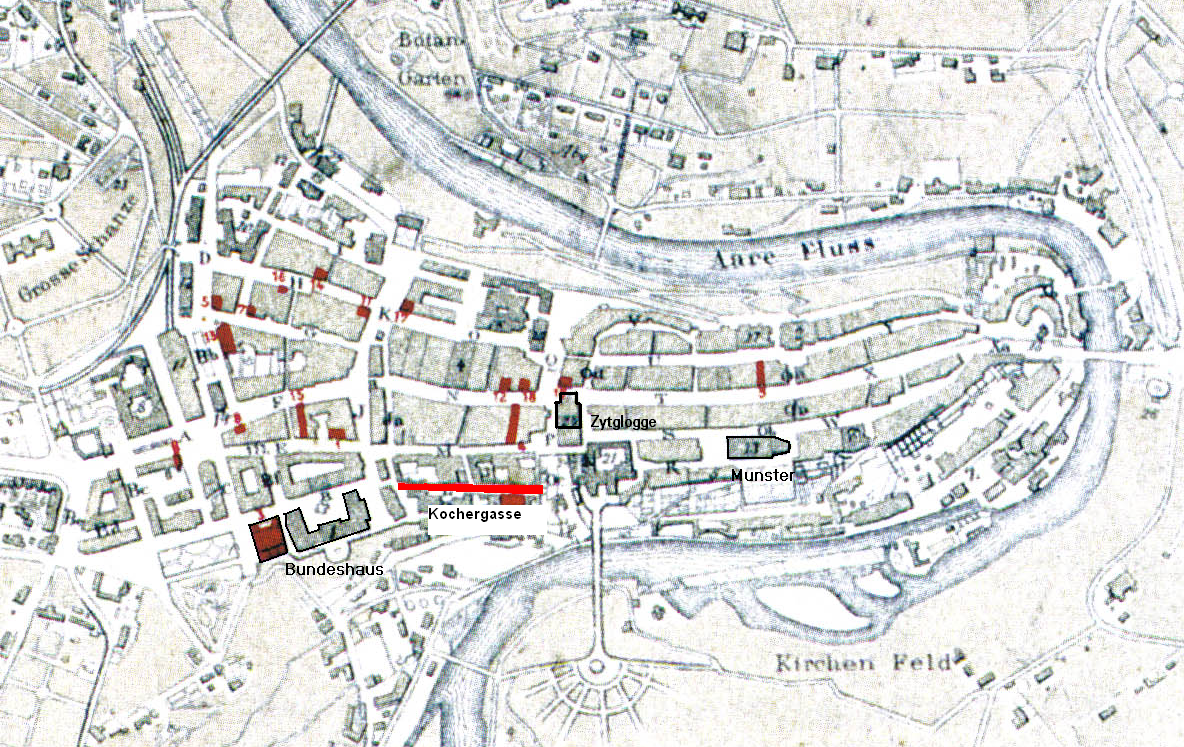
- Old City of Bern with Kochergasse highlighted
- Interactive map of Kochergasse
- Length: 200 m (660 ft)
- Location: Old City of Bern, Bern, Switzerland
- Postal code: 3011
- Coordinates: 46°56′48.59″N 7°26′49.1″E

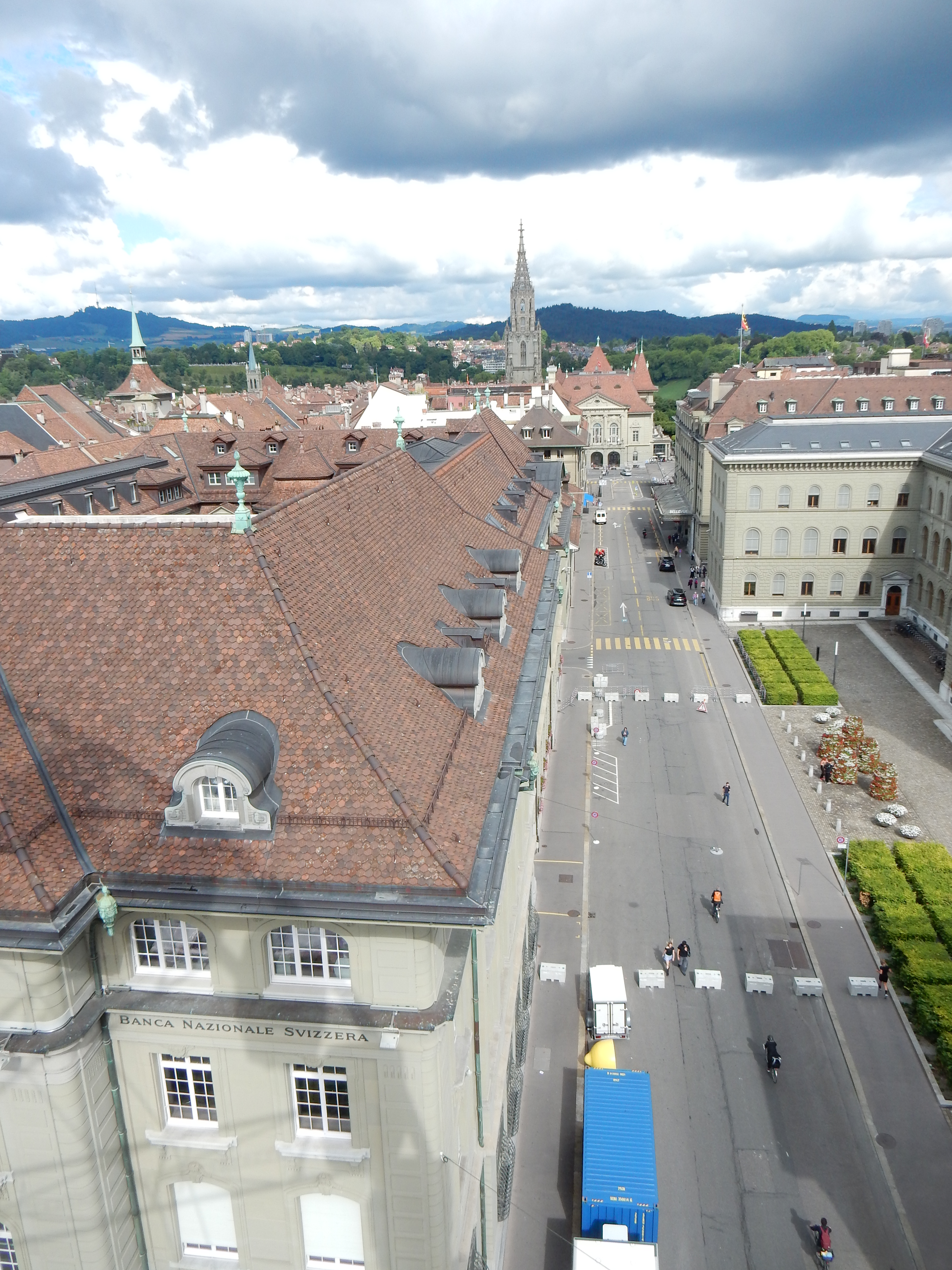
Kochergasse Bern

The Kochergasse is one of the streets in the Old City of Bern, the medieval city center of Bern, Switzerland. It is part of the Innere Neustadt which was built during the expansion of 1255 to 1260.

It runs in front of the Bundeshaus East and it is part of the UNESCO Cultural World Heritage Site that encompasses the Old City.
