= Karl Müller =

Karl Müller may refer to:

- Karl Müller (astronomer) (1866–1942), Austrian astronomer
- Karl Müller (bryologist) (Karl Johann August (Friedrich Wilhelm) Müller, 1818–1899), German bryologist
- Karl Müller (inventor) (born 1952), Swiss inventor and engineer
- Karl Müller (rower) (1912–?), Swiss Olympic rower
- Karl Emanuel Müller (1804–1869), Swiss engineer and politician
- Karl Franz Müller (1738–1797), Swiss officer and politician
- Karl H. Müller (born 1953), Austrian social scientist
- Karl Martin Müller (1767–1831), Swiss officer and politician
- Karl Otfried Müller (1797–1840), German classical scholar and admirer of Dorians and Spartans
- Karl Wilhelm Ludwig Müller (1813–1894), German classical scholar and editor of Fragmenta Historicorum Graecorum
- K. Alex Müller (Karl Alexander Müller, 1927–2023), Swiss physicist, 1987 Nobel Prize
- Karl Müller (politician) (1884–1964), German politician
- Carl Wilhelm Müller (1728–1801), also Karl, mayor of the city of Leipzig

== See also ==
- Karl von Müller (1873–1923), German naval captain
- Karl Mueller (1963–2005), Americanrock musician
- Carl Muller (1935–2019), Sri Lankan writer
- Carl A. Muller (1913–1991), Canadian politician
- Carl Otto Müller (1901–1970), German painter
