= Karl Alfons Bessler von Wattingen =

Swiss politician (1734–1784)

- Born: 5 January 1734; Altdorf, Uri, Old Swiss Confederacy
- Died: 15 March 1784 (aged 50); Altdorf, Uri, Old Swiss Confederacy
- Occupations: Landowner; rentier; politician
- Spouses: Helena Kunigunda Crivelli (m. 1755) Maria Anna Catharina Müller (m. 1772)
- Father: Friedrich Alfons Bessler von Wattingen
- Relatives: Karl Martin Müller (son-in-law)

Karl Alfons Bessler von Wattingen (5 January 1734 – 15 March 1784), also Karl Alfons Bessler, was a Swiss politician from Altdorf in the canton of Uri. He was Landammann of Uri in 1764–1766 and 1776–1778 and an envoy to the Federal Diet from 1764 to 1781. With his brother-in-law Josef Anton Müller he led the Spanish party in Uri.

== Biography ==
Karl Alfons Bessler von Wattingen was born on 5 January 1734 in Altdorf, the son of Friedrich Alfons Bessler von Wattingen. In 1755 he married Helena Kunigunda, daughter of Franz Maria Josef Leonz Crivelli, and in 1772 Maria Anna Catharina Müller, daughter of Jakob Anton Müller, a captain in Neapolitan service. He was related by marriage to the Landammanns Franz Sebastian Crivelli, Josef Anton Müller, Jost Anton Müller and Karl Franz Müller. His daughter Waldburga married Karl Martin Müller in 1802.

Bessler was cantonal clerk (Landschreiber) of Uri from 1755 to 1762, deputy Landammann (Landesstatthalter) from 1762 to 1764, and Landammann from 1764 to 1766 and from 1776 to 1778. From 1778 to 1780 he was bailiff (Landvogt) in the Rheintal, and from 1764 to 1781 an envoy to the Federal Diet (Tagsatzung). In 1780 he declined election as banneret (Pannerherr) for financial reasons; the office then remained vacant until 1803.

Bessler was a landowner, rentier and highly respected politician. With his brother-in-law Josef Anton Müller he led the Spanish party in Uri. He died in Altdorf on 15 March 1784.

== Bibliography ==
- U. Kälin, Die Urner Magistratenfamilien, 1991

=== Archives ===
- Uri State Archives (Staatsarchiv Uri), Altdorf: parts of his personal papers (Nachlass)
