= List of Aare bridges in Bern =

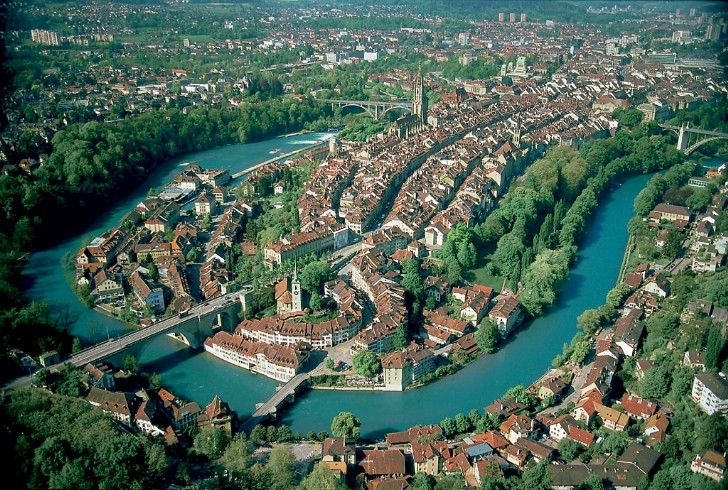
The Aare peninsula and the Old City. Along the river from left to right: Kirchenfeldbrücke, Nydeggbrücke, Untertorbrücke, Kornhausbrücke.

This is a list of the 18 bridges spanning the river Aare on the territory of the city of Bern, Switzerland.

With the historical city core situated on a steeply-flanked peninsula formed by the river, the Aare is a defining part of Bern's cityscape and features prominently in the city's 800-year history. Given its topography, the city's development in modern times was dependent on the construction of long high level bridges. Their construction in the 19th and 20th century at times stretched the limits of the possible.

The building of the great bridges was a continuous topic of political controversy in Bern up until World War II. The disputes about the location and even the construction materials of the bridges – stone or iron – reflected the rivalry between the city's conservative and liberal factions.

== Bridge locations ==
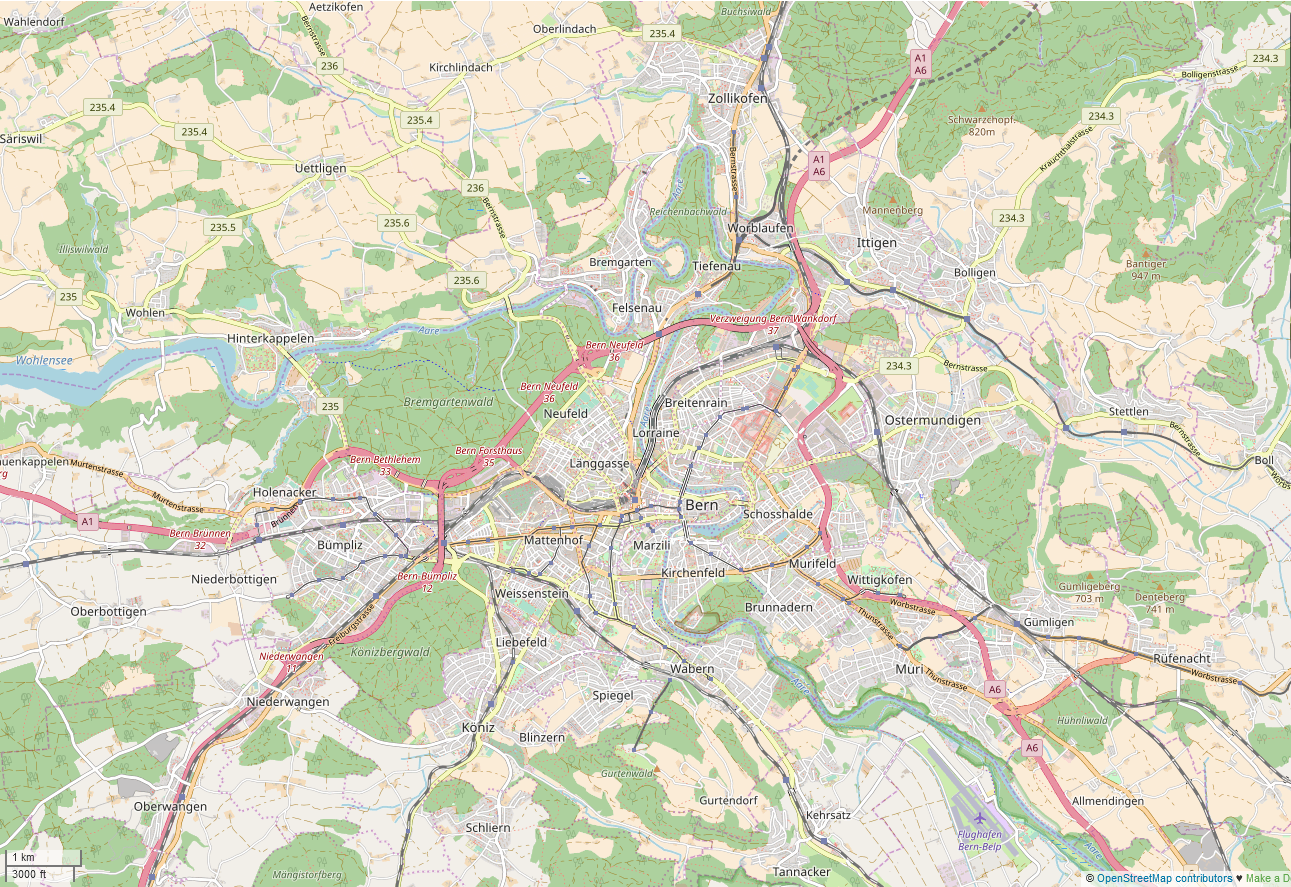
Aare bridges near Bern
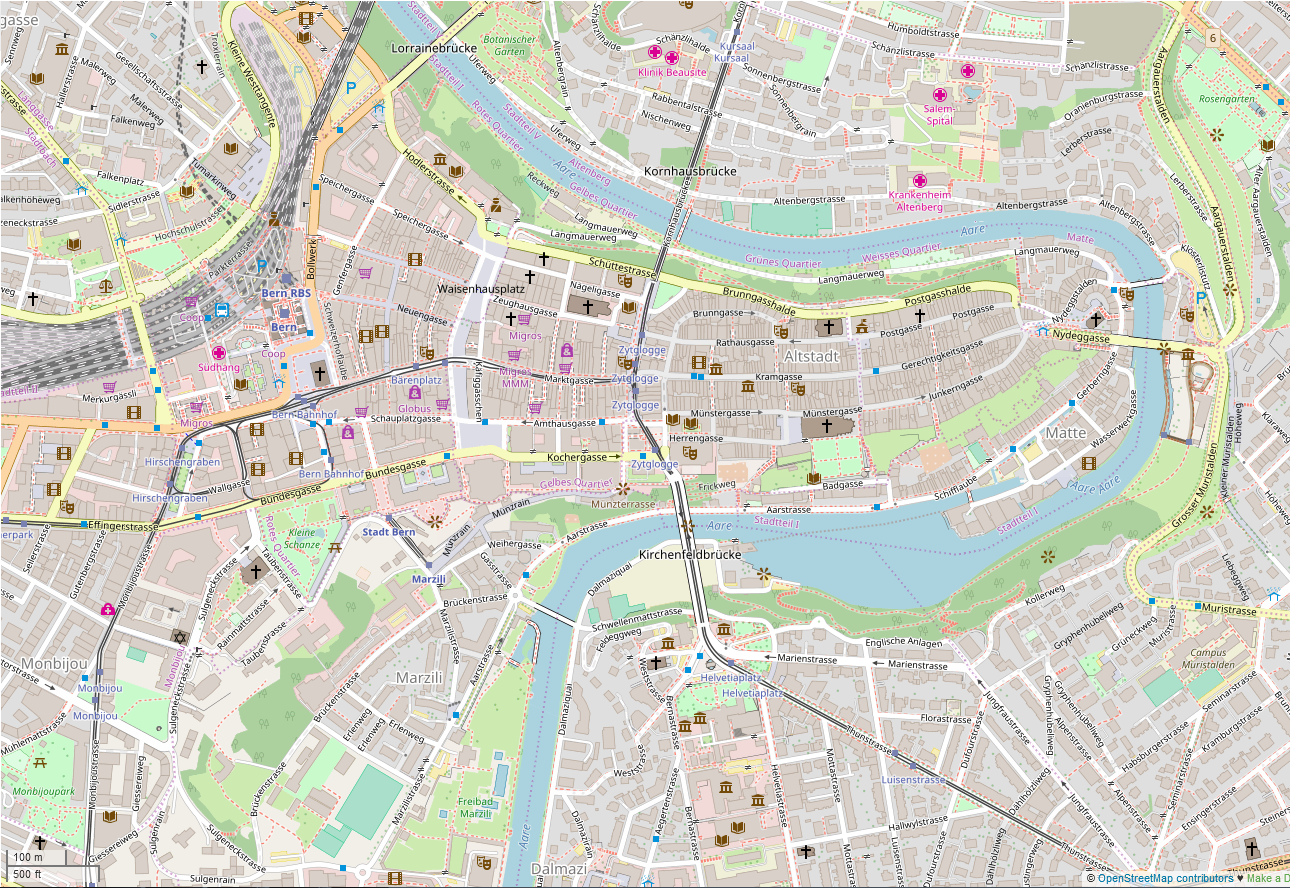
Aare bridges near The Old City of Bern

== Current bridges ==
In the table, "length" refers to the distance between abutments. The height is measured from the pavement to the mean water level.

Image	Name and description	Opened	Length	Height	Span	Location	
Untertorbrücke	Untertorbrücke: Built in wood 1256, rebuilt in stone 1489. The city's only Aare bridge up until 1834.	1256 / 1489	52.5 m (172 ft)	8 m (26 ft)	15 m (49 ft), also twice 14 m (46 ft)	46.9493°N 7.4584°E	6
Neubrügg	Neubrügg ("new bridge"): First built in 1466 to replace a ferry, rebuilt in 1535. Covered bridge on sandstone pillars, oldest wooden bridge in the Canton.	1466 / 1535	91 m (299 ft)	6 m (20 ft)	21 m (69 ft) to 16 m (52 ft), 5 spans	46.9738°N 7.4281°E	17
Altenbergsteg	Altenbergsteg: Footbridge built to connect the city to the Altenberg residential area. Built in wood in 1834 to replace an 1823 ferry, rebuilt in iron 1857.	1834 / 1857	57 m (187 ft)	5 m (16 ft)	57 m (187 ft)	46.9502°N 7.4485°E	7
Nydeggbrücke	Nydeggbrücke: First high level bridge, sheathed in sandstone. Its main arch is the widest stone arch in continental Europe. Built by a consortium of conservative burghers and financed through usage fees.	1840	148 m (486 ft)	23 m (75 ft)	46 m (151 ft) (main arch), 17 m (56 ft) (side arches)	46.9485°N 7.4584°E	5
Tiefenaubrücke	Tiefenaubrücke: High level stone bridge built by the liberal government in reaction to the Nydeggbrücke. Original design marred by 1977 broadening. Parallel railway bridge opened 1965.	1850	92 m (302 ft)	31 m (102 ft)	25 m (82 ft), thrice	46.9770°N 7.4568°E	14
Dalmazibrücke	Dalmazibrücke: Riverbank-level bridge in the Marzili neighbourhood, originally built as an iron bridge in 1872; demolished and rebuilt in prestressed concrete in 1958.	1872 / 1958	63 m (207 ft)	4 m (13 ft)	20 m (66 ft), thrice	46.9445°N 7.4458°E	3
Kirchenfeldbrücke	Kirchenfeldbrücke: First iron high level bridge, inspired by contemporary English designs. Built to develop the Kirchenfeld neighbourhood.	1883	229 m (751 ft)	39 m (128 ft)	86 m (282 ft), twice	46.9459°N 7.4485°E	4
Kornhausbrücke	Kornhausbrücke: High level bridge of stone and iron intended to develop the Lorraine neighbourhood.	1898	355 m (1,165 ft)	48 m (157 ft)	115 m (377 ft) and five times 36 m (118 ft)	46.9506°N 7.4485°E	8
Schönausteg	Schönausteg: Iron footbridge in the style of the Altenbergsteg, near the Dählhölzli zoo.	1906	54 m (177 ft)	4 m (13 ft)	54 m (177 ft)	46.9344°N 7.4460°E	1
Halenbrücke	Halenbrücke: High level concrete bridge, only lightly reinforced, leading to Kirchlindach.	1913	234 m (768 ft)	38 m (125 ft)	87 m (285 ft) and four times 21 m (69 ft)	46.971137°N 7.418502°E	18
Seftausteg	Seftausteg: Iron footbridge at the Felsenau power plant.	1921	53 m (174 ft)	5 m (16 ft)	53 m (174 ft)	46.9694°N 7.4389°E	16
Felsenaubrücke	Felsenaubrücke: First built by the army as a wooden bridge in 1929, rebuilt as a solid-web girder bridge made of packed concrete in 1949. Not to be confused with the later Felsenauviadukt.	1928 / 1949	63 m (207 ft)	8 m (26 ft)	16 m (52 ft), thrice	46.9760°N 7.4405°E	15
Lorrainebrücke	Lorrainebrücke: First reinforced concrete high level bridge, built in the then-popular Heimatstil to resemble the older stone bridges.	1930	178 m (584 ft)	38 m (125 ft)	82 m (269 ft)	46.9529°N 7.4433°E	9
Railway viaduct (Lorraineviadukt)	Lorraine railway viaduct or Lorraineviadukt: Built in concrete by the Federal Railways to replace the aging Rote Brücke. It was the longest four-track railway viaduct in Europe at the time of construction.	1941	1,093 m (3,586 ft)	43 m (141 ft)	150 m (490 ft)	46.9540°N 7.4419°E	10
Monbijoubrücke	Monbijoubrücke: Designed as a high-traffic four-lane automobile bridge at a peak of general automobile enthusiasm; executed in prestressed concrete.	1962	338 m (1,109 ft)	22 m (72 ft)	86 m (282 ft) twice and 81 m (266 ft) twice	46.9400°N 7.4447°E	2
Tiefenaubrücke (RBS)	Tiefenaubrücke (RBS): High level bridge in prestressed concrete built alongside the Tiefenaubrücke for the RBS railway.	1965	200 m (660 ft)	30 m (98 ft)	97 m (318 ft)	46.9770°N 7.4571°E	13
Felsenauviadukt	Felsenauviadukt: Longest viaduct of the A1 highway and the world's first single-cell box girder bridge built with the cantilever method, a pioneer work in prestressed concrete construction. Design by Christian Menn.	1975	1,116 m (3,661 ft)	63 m (207 ft)	156 m (512 ft) twice, 48 m (157 ft) twice	46.9693°N 7.4477°E	12
Stauwehr Engehalde	Stauwehr Engehalde: Steel walkway across the Engehalde weir.	1998	61 m (200 ft)	—	—	46.9655°N 7.4449°E	11

== Former bridges ==
Apart from the bridges that were rebuilt in the same spot, as noted above, one bridge no longer exists:

	Name and description	In operation	Length	Height	Span	Location
Rote Brücke	Rote Brücke (Red Bridge): High level bridge on stone pillars; the first railway bridge, iron bridge and double-decker bridge in Bern. Generally referred to by its red colour, it also acquired the sobriquet Würgengel ("Angel of Death") because of frequent fatal accidents. Replaced by the Lorrainebrücke and the modern railway bridge.	1858–1941	164 m (538 ft)	43 m (141 ft) (lower deck)	57 m (187 ft) and twice 50 m (160 ft)	46.9531°N 7.4429°E

== Ferries ==
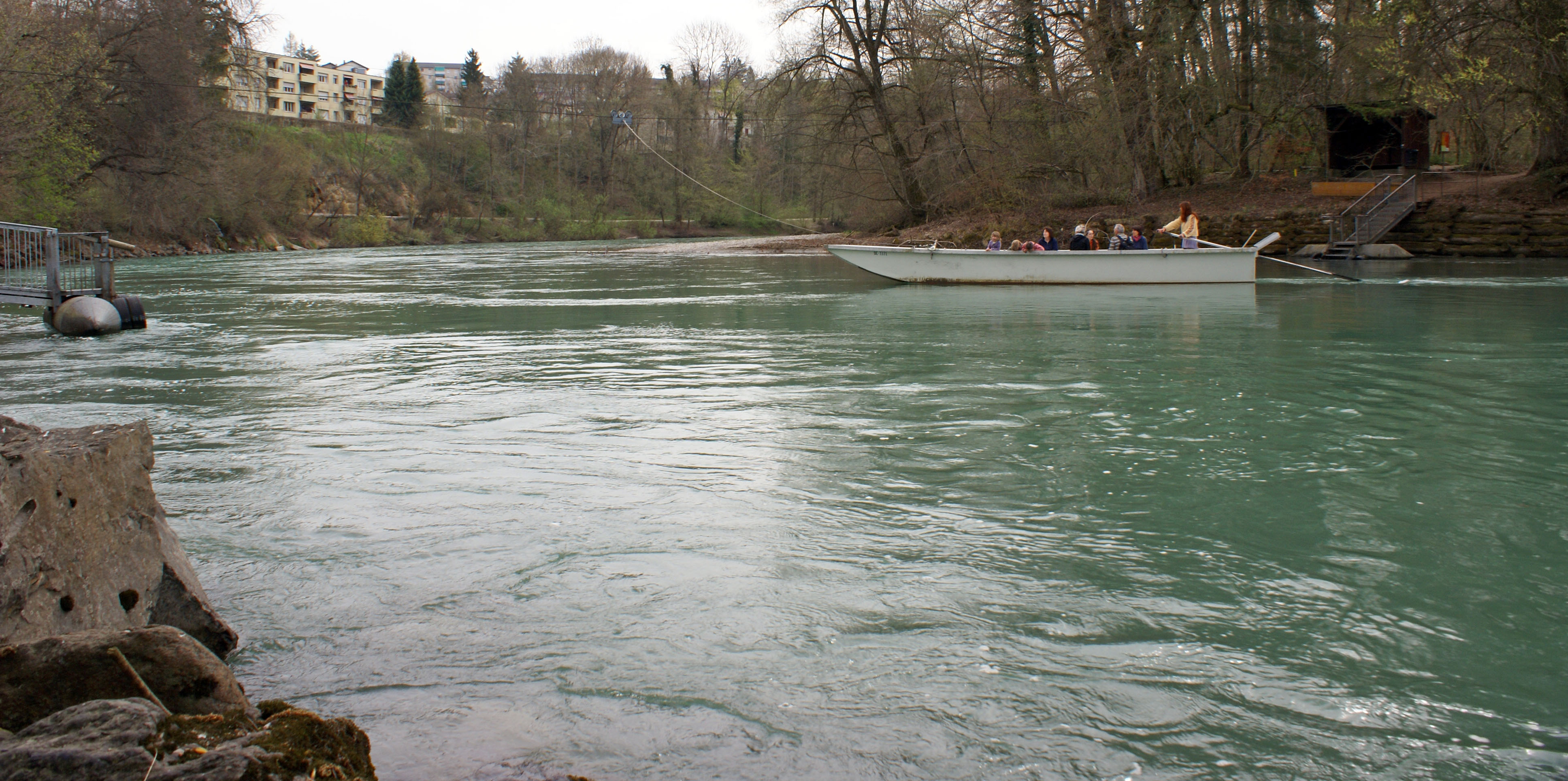
The Reichenbach ferry.

Before the building of the major bridges, a number of ferries existed in Bern to carry passengers and cargo across the Aare. Two remain in service:

- The Reichenbach ferry (46.9907°N 7.4505°E) is a cable ferry established in 1743. It links the tip of the Enge peninsula to Reichenbach Castle in Zollikofen.
- The Zehndermätteli ferry (46°58′49.5″N 7°26′30″E) is a cable ferry linking the Enge peninsula to Bremgarten.

== See also ==
- List of bridges in Switzerland

== Bibliography ==
- Caviezel, Zita; Herzog, Georges; Keller, Jürg A. (2006), Basel-Landschaft, Basel-Stadt, Bern, Solothurn, Kunstführer durch die Schweiz, vol. 3 (1st ed.), Bern: Gesellschaft für Schweizerische Kunstgeschichte, p. 248, ISBN 3-906131-97-1
- Furrer, Bernhard (1984), Übergänge: Berner Aarebrücken, Geschichte und Gegenwart, Bern: Benteli, ISBN 3-7165-0492-0
- Hofer, Paul (1959), Die Stadt Bern., Kunstdenkmäler des Kantons Bern, vol. 1, Basel: Gesellschaft für Schweizerische Kunstgeschichte / Verlag Birkhäuser, pp. 193–224, ISBN 3-906131-13-0, archived from the original on 7 July 2011
- von Bergen, Stefan (1998), "Brückenschläge in die Zukunft – die Schlüsselrolle der Hochbrücken in Berns Urbanisierung", in Lüthi, Christian; Meier, Bernhard (eds.), Bern – eine Stadt bricht auf: Schauplätze und Geschichten der Berner Stadtentwicklung zwischen 1798 und 1998, Bern: Paul Haupt, pp. 25–40, ISBN 3-258-05721-4
- Weber, Berchtold (1976), Historisch-topographisches Lexikon der Stadt Bern, Bern: Berner Burgerbibliothek, ISBN 3-7272-0045-6, archived from the original on 18 June 2008
