= Joseph Hollingsworth =

Joseph Hollingsworth could refer to:

- Joe E. Hollingsworth (1908–1975), Los Angeles City Council member
- Joe Hollingsworth (1925-1975) American football player
- J. Rogers Hollingsworth (Joseph Rogers Hollingsworth, 1932-2019) American historian and sociologist
- Trey Hollingsworth (Joseph Albert Hollingsworth III, born 1983), American businessman and politician
