= List of parks in Bern =

The city of Bern, Switzerland, has 130 urban parks and 95 public playgrounds with a total surface area of 4.2 square kilometres (1,000 acres). These venues are maintained by the City Nursery (Stadtgärtnerei).

== Principal parks ==
=== Inner City ===
In the Old City, the most prominent green spaces are those on the sunny southern ridge of the Old City peninsula. From west to east, these are the Kleine Schanze, the Bundesterrasse, the privately owned Casinoterrasse and the Münsterplattform.

=== Bundesterrasse ===
The Bundesterrasse (Federal Terrace) is the terrace on the south, Aar-facing front of the Federal Palace of Switzerland, the building housing the Swiss federal parliament and several federal executive departments. The terrace follows the ridge of the Old City peninsula from the Kleine Schanze in the west to the Hotel Bellevue Palace and the Kirchenfeldbrücke in the east.

== List of parks ==
This partial list is taken from the website of the City Nursery. Coordinates are derived from the city GIS.

Image	Name	Location	Notes
	Bundesterrasse	46.9460°N 7.4431°E	Terrace south of the Federal Palace, overlooking the River Aar and the Marzili neighborhood.
Münsterplattform	Münsterplattform	46.9468°N 7.4518°E	Terrace south of the cathedral, the Münster of Bern, overlooking the Aar and the Matte neighborhood. (Images)
Weltpostdenkmal, Kleine Schanze	Kleine Schanze	46.9456°N 7.4404°E	Part of the former city fortifications (Schanze), now the Old City of Bern's principal park, with numerous monuments and a bandstand.
	Schütte	46.9496°N 7.4487°E	The northern slope of the Aar peninsula between Lorrainebrücke and the Nydegg neighborhood, currently in the process of restoration.
	Aaregg Kinderspielplatz II	46.9729°N 7.4522°E	Small public playground.
	Hintere Engehalde	46.9703°N 7.447°E	
	Engepromenade	46.9640°N 7.4417°E	
	Rossfeld Park		
University of Bern, Grosse Schanze	Grosse Schanze	46.9499°N 7.4388°E	Formerly part of the city fortifications, now a large roof terrace in front of the University of Bern's main building.
	Studerstein	46.9625°N 7.4333°E	Arboretum founded in 1809 with 350 species of tree. Monument to mountaineer and draftsman Gottlieb Samuel Studer (1804-1890).
	Alter Tierpark	46.9563°N 7.4387°E	From 1881 to 1937 a small zoo (Hirschenpark) with deer and bisons.
	Bürenpark	46.9385°N 7.4393°E	Small park near a church community building.
	Floraanlage	46.9430°N 7.4370°E	Small park near the U.S. embassy.
	Gaswerkareal	46.9374°N 7.4429°E	Large recreational area with sports facilities on the bank of the river Aar, near the Gaskessel cultural venue.
	Goumoensmatte Spielplatz	46.9341°N 7.4295°E	Small public lawn and playground.
Kocherpark	Kocherpark	46.9464°N 7.4329°E	Named after physician and Nobel laureate Theodor Kocher (1841–1917).
Lentulushubel	Lentulushubel	46.9378°N 7.4250°E	Grave of General Rupertus Scipio Lentulus (1714–1786) on a small hillock.
	Monbijou Park	46.9421°N 7.4348°E	Park and playground behind the Oberzolldirektion.
	Schlossmatt Spielplatz	46.9435°N 7.4150°E	Small public lawn and playground among residential buildings.
Schwarztoranlage	Schwarztoranlage	46.9446°N 7.4311°E	Small tree-lined park on a busy street.
Steinhölzli	Steinhölzli Spielplatz	46.9359°N 7.4254°E	Public playground near a small forest.
Veielihubel	Veielihubel	46.9440°N 7.4226°E	Small park area on a hillock providing a view over part of the city.
	Dalmaziquai	46.9369°N 7.44513°E	Riverwalk on the eastern shore of the Aar near the Tierpark Dählhölzli.
	Egelsee	46.9445°N 7.4649°E	
	Elfenau	46.9329°N 7.4657°E	
	Jupiterstrasse	46.9392°N 7.4825°E	
	N6–Überdeckung	46.9427°N 7.4733°E	
	Rosengarten	46.9519°N 7.4603°E	
	Schönbergpark	46.9501°N 7.4645°E	
	Traffeletweg	46.9472°N 7.4748°E	
	Grosse Allmend	46.9622°N 7.4701°E	
	Kleine Allmend	46.9602°N 7.4761°E	
	Breitenrain Park	46.9573°N 7.4488°E	
	Obere Humboldtstrasse	46.9532°N 7.4555°E	
	Johanneskirche	46.9575°N 7.4500°E	
	Schützenweg		
	Spitalackerpark		
	Bachmätteli und SVB		
	Bethlehem Park		
	Brünnen Tunnelüberdeckung		
	Bümpliz Schlosspark		
	Schwabgut		
	Tscharnergut		
	Winterhalde		
