= Josef Anton Arnold =

Swiss politician (1765–1821)

- Born: 26 September 1765; Probably Altdorf, Uri, Old Swiss Confederacy
- Died: 18 November 1821 (aged 56); Altdorf, Uri, Switzerland
- Occupations: Merchant; politician
- Spouse: Maria Elisabeth Imhof (m. 1796)
- Father: Josef Anton Arnold
- Relatives: Franz Xaver Arnold (brother); Karl Emanuel Müller (son-in-law)

Josef Anton Arnold (26 September 1765 – 18 November 1821) was a Swiss merchant and politician from Altdorf in the canton of Uri. He founded the forwarding firm Anton Arnold & Söhne, was Landammann of Uri in 1811–1812 and was an envoy to the Federal Diet from 1804 to 1814. He was the main pillar of the old-minded party and the secret head of the conservative opposition movement of 1814–1815 against the Federal Treaty.

== Biography ==
Josef Anton Arnold was born on 26 September 1765, probably in Altdorf, the son of Josef Anton Arnold, a councillor (Ratsherr), innkeeper and wine merchant. His brother was Franz Xaver Arnold. In 1796 he married Maria Elisabeth Imhof, daughter of Josef Maria Imhof, a merchant. His daughter Josefa married Karl Emanuel Müller in 1844.

Arnold attended the Latin school in Altdorf and the Gymnasium in Bellinzona. He was a trading entrepreneur (Handelsunternehmer) and the founder of the forwarding firm (Speditionsfirma) Anton Arnold & Söhne.

During the Helvetic Republic, Arnold was captain of an imperial free corps (kaiserliches Freicorps). In 1803 he became cantonal ensign (Landesfähnrich), from 1809 to 1811 he was deputy Landammann (Landesstatthalter), and in 1811–1812 he was Landammann of Uri. From 1804 to 1814 he was an envoy to the Federal Diet (Tagsatzung).

Arnold was the main pillar of the old-minded party (altgesinnte Partei) and the secret head of the conservative opposition movement of 1814–1815, which opposed the Federal Treaty (Bundesvertrag). He was a popular politician with considerable influence among the rural population of Uri. He died in Altdorf on 18 November 1821.

== Bibliography ==
- U. Kälin, Die Urner Magistratenfamilien, 1991
