= Lorraine railway viaduct =

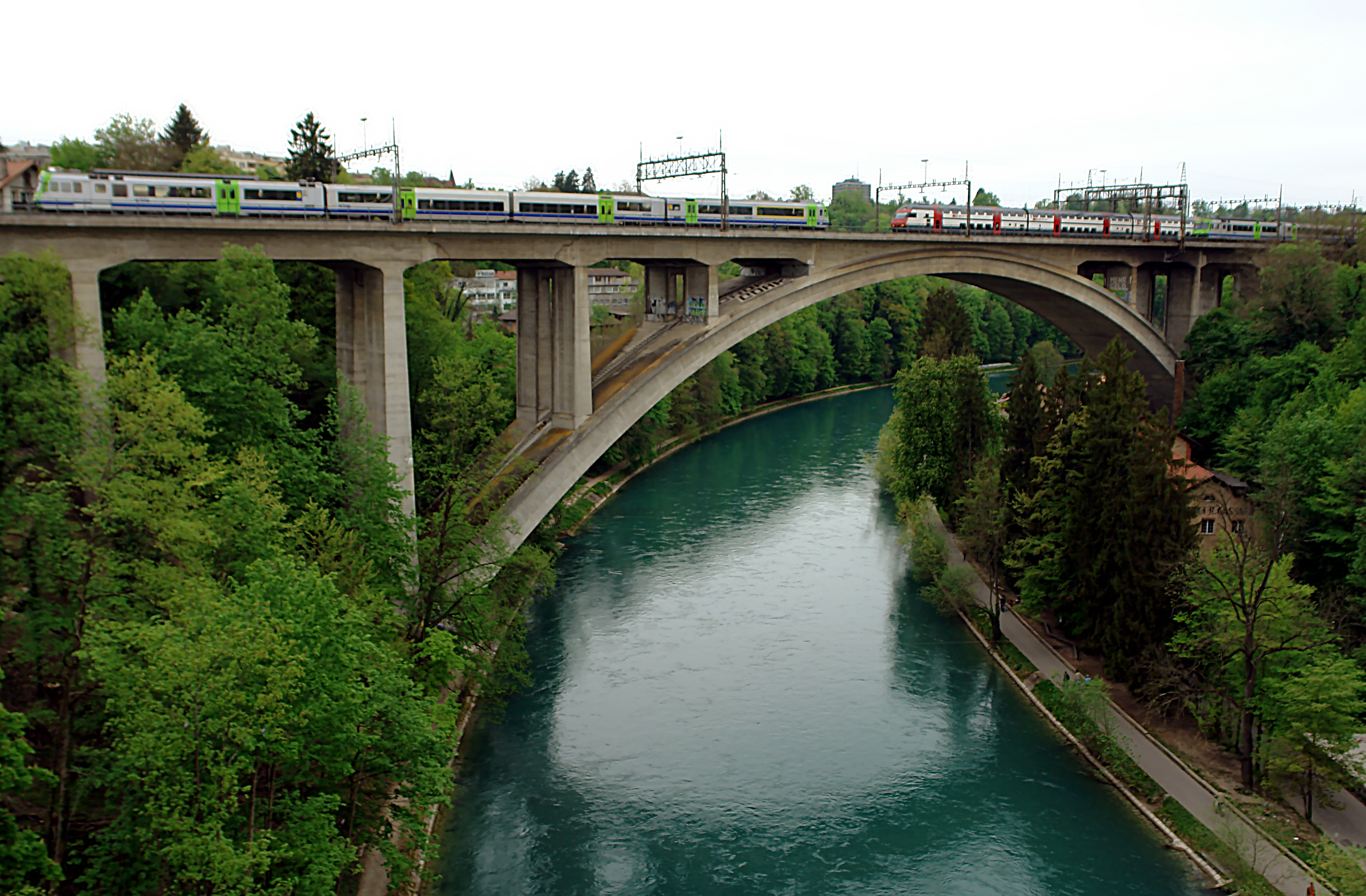
- Coordinates: 46°57′14″N 7°26′31″E
- Crosses: Aare
- Locale: Bern, Switzerland
- Preceded by: Rote Brücke (Bern)

Characteristics
- Material: Reinforced concrete
- Total length: 1,092 metres (3,583 ft)

History
- Construction start: 1936
- Opened: 1941

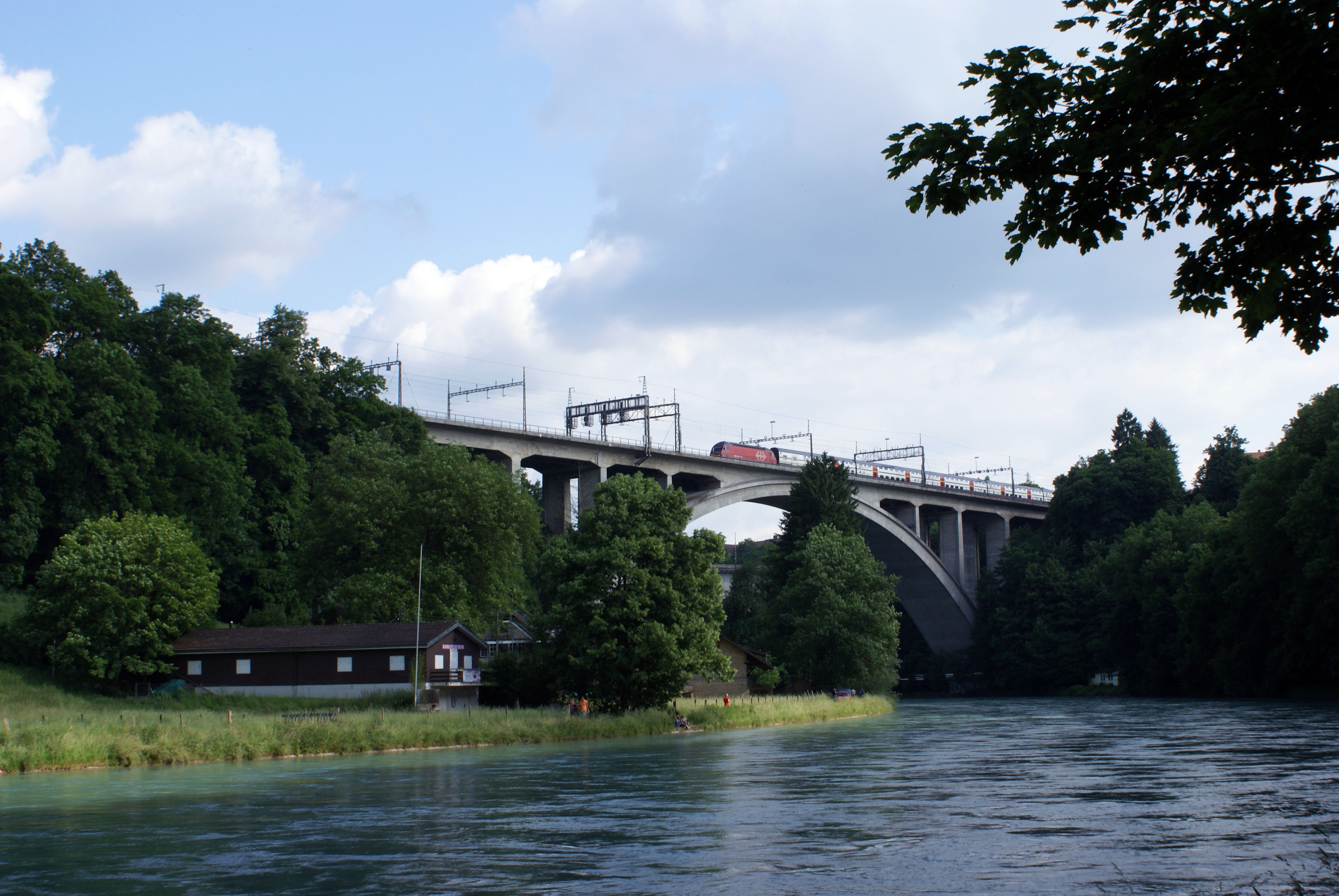
The viaduct seen from river level

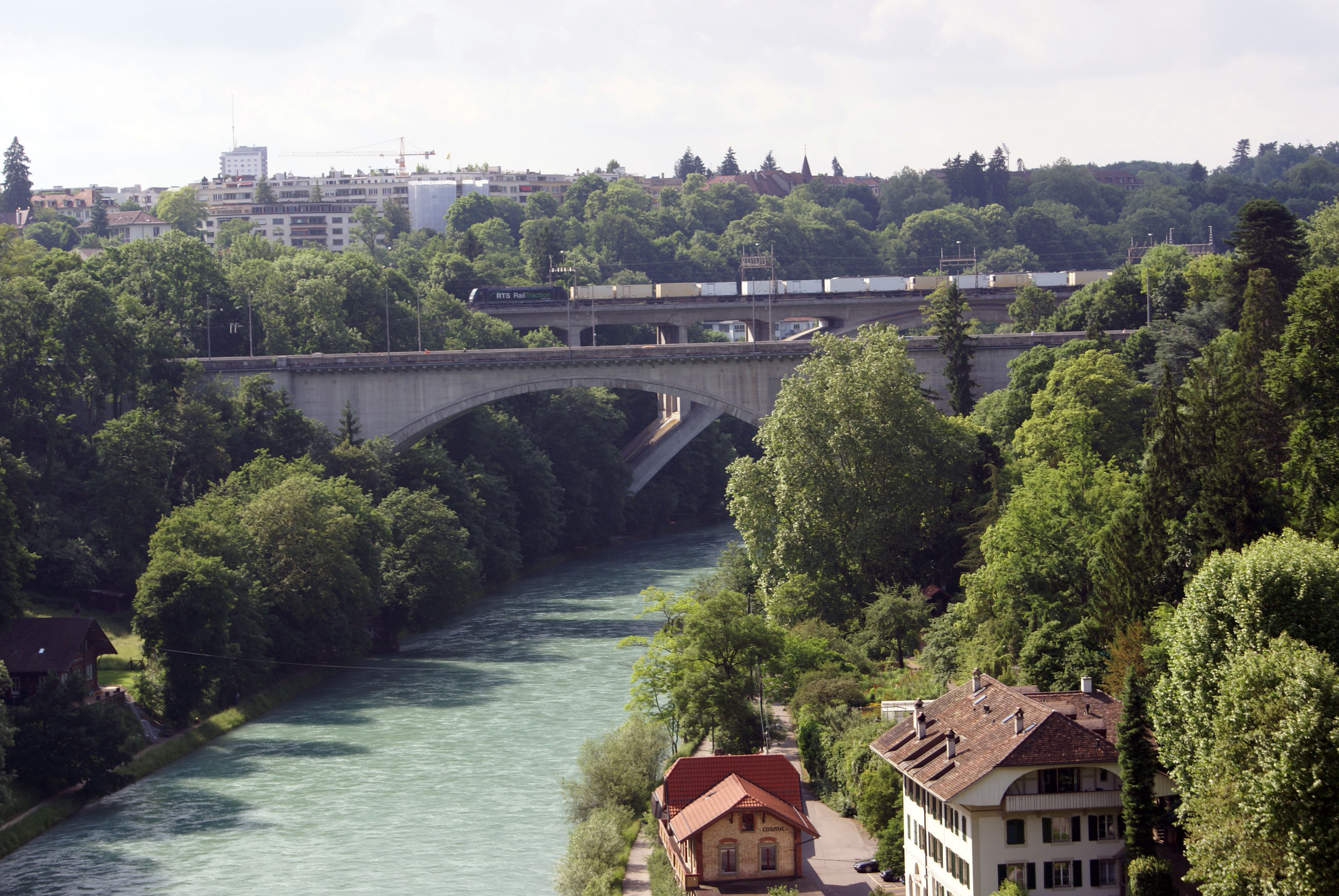
Road (front) and rail (rear) bridges

The Lorraine railway viaduct, or Lorraineviadukt, is a railway viaduct in the Swiss city of Bern. It carries the Olten–Bern railway across the River Aare immediately to the north of Bern railway station. The Lorraine road bridge is adjacent.

The bridge was built in concrete by the Swiss Federal Railways to replace the aging Rote Brücke and opened in 1941. It is 1,092 metres (3,583 ft) in length and was the longest four-track railway viaduct in Europe at the time of construction.

== See also ==
- List of Aare bridges in Bern
