= Johann Victor Laurenz von Hettlingen =

Landammann of Schwyz (1733–1793)

- Born: 15 August 1733; Schwyz, Old Swiss Confederacy
- Died: 2 February 1793 (aged 59); Schwyz, Old Swiss Confederacy
- Occupation: Politician
- Spouse: Carolina von Hettlingen (m. 1765)
- Father: Josef Anton von Hettlingen
- Relatives: Johann Carl von Hettlingen (father-in-law); Karl Martin Müller (son-in-law)

Johann Victor Laurenz von Hettlingen (also Johann Victor Laurenz von Hedlinger; 15 August 1733 – 2 February 1793) was a Swiss politician from Schwyz. He was Landammann of Schwyz in 1769–1771, 1777–1779 and 1781–1785, and between 1754 and 1790 he was repeatedly an envoy to the Federal Diet. In 1792 he was raised to the nobility by Emperor Leopold II.

== Biography ==
Johann Victor Laurenz von Hettlingen was born on 15 August 1733 in Schwyz, the son of Josef Anton von Hettlingen, a member of the council (Ratsherr). In 1765 he married his cousin Carolina von Hettlingen, daughter of Johann Carl von Hettlingen. In 1809 his daughter Franziska married Karl Martin Müller.

Hettlingen was a captain and a member of the council (Ratsherr) in Schwyz. He was cantonal archivist (Landesarchivar) from 1755 to 1770, a member of the Seven (Siebner) of the Neuviertel quarter from 1758 to 1769, treasurer (Landessäckelmeister) from 1761 to 1765 and deputy Landammann (Landesstatthalter) from 1765 to 1767. He was Landammann of Schwyz in 1769–1771, 1777–1779 and 1781–1785, and between 1754 and 1790 he was repeatedly an envoy to the Federal Diet (Tagsatzung). In 1774 he was envoy to the bishop of Constance, Cardinal Franz Konrad von Rodt, concerning the consecration of the new parish church in Schwyz.

In 1792 Hettlingen was raised to the nobility by Emperor Leopold II. He turned the Katzensteig estate in the Thurgau, which he had inherited, into an entailed estate (Fideikommiss). He died in Schwyz on 2 February 1793.

== Archives ==
- Schwyz State Archives (Staatsarchiv Schwyz), Schwyz: personnel files (Personalakten)
