= Mattequartier =

Quarter in Bern, Switzerland

Coordinates: 46°56′49.8″N 7°27′22.4″E

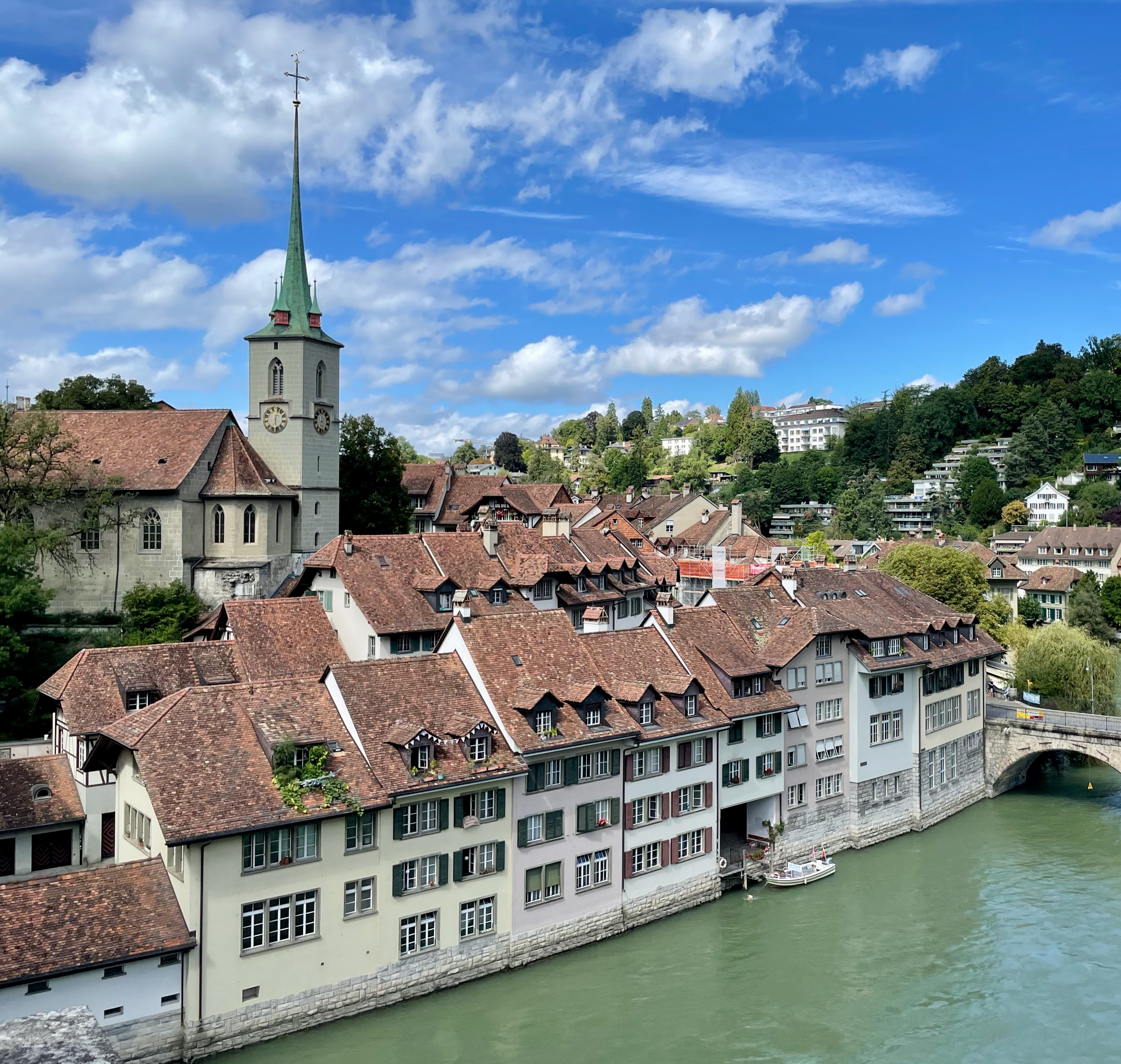
Mattequartier on the Aare riverfront, Bern

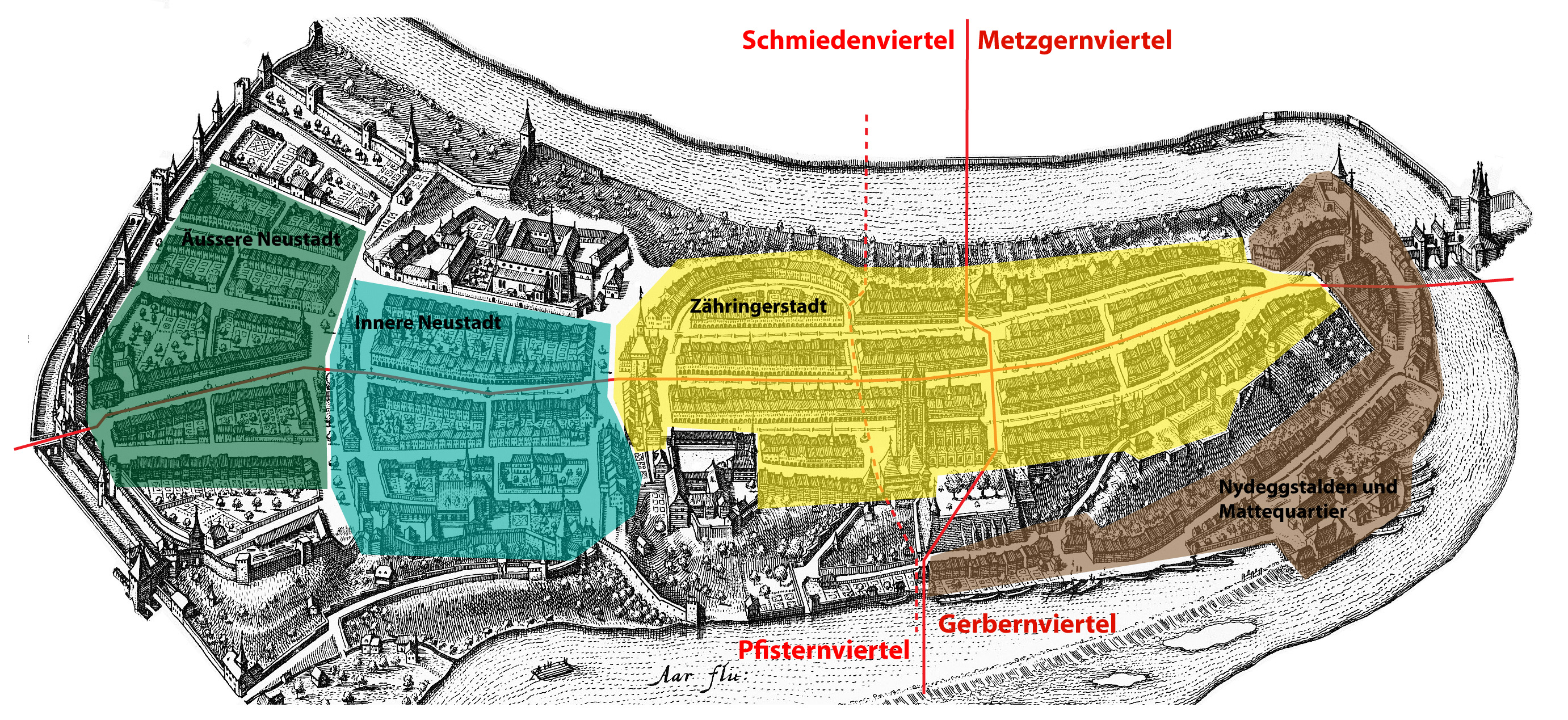
The Viertel and Quartiere of the old city (click to enlarge)

The Mattequartier is a historic neighbourhood on the Aare riverfront in the Old City of Bern, Switzerland.

== History ==
The city of Bern was founded in 1191 by Duke Berthold V of Zähringen, with its oldest neighbourhood known as the Zähringerstadt. While the Zähringerstadt expanded on the Aare peninsula, the area along the riverbank developed into the Mattequartier.

Following the destruction of Nydegg Castle in 1268, the riverside settlement at the foot of the castle was fortified, and the Mattequartier was extended southwards as part of Bern's urban expansion.

Situated in the southeast of the peninsula, the Mattequartier, together with the Nydegg, constituted medieval Bern's smallest neighbourhoods. Workshops and mercantile activity prevailed in this area, and medieval sources record complaints about the constant noise of machinery, carts, and commerce. The Matte included three artificial channels, constructed in 1360, which diverted water from the Aare to power three city-owned watermills.

In the early 20th century, a small hydroelectric plant was built at the same site. Nearby, the Schiffländte (ship landing-place) served as a busy transshipment point for goods moved up and down the river.

== Flooding ==
=== 1999 flood ===
In May 1999, the Mattequartier was severely flooded when the Aare rose rapidly after heavy rainfall. Streets and ground floors were inundated, and boats were used to navigate alleys in the historic district. Damages in Bern were later estimated at over 90 million Swiss francs.

=== 2005 flood ===
In August 2005, the Mattequartier was flooded when the Aare River overflowed its banks. Water reached the first floors of buildings, prompting the evacuation of over 240 residents by police boats. The event, considered more severe than the 1999 flood, drew criticism of local authorities for failing to clear the weir and dredge the riverbed as promised. According to Der Bund, the neighbourhood was inundated within an hour, and damages were again estimated at over 90 million Swiss francs.

=== Flood protection measures ===
In the aftermath of the 1999 and 2005 floods, Bern and the canton introduced a series of protective measures along the Aare. These measures included access points for cranes to remove driftwood around the Tych, mobile flood barriers for emergencies, and an SMSwarning system.

In 2023, Bern voters approved a long-term programme costing around 150 million Swiss francs. The work is expected to continue into the 2030s and includes new sandstone flood walls around the Mattequartier and other projects along the Aare.

== Gallery ==
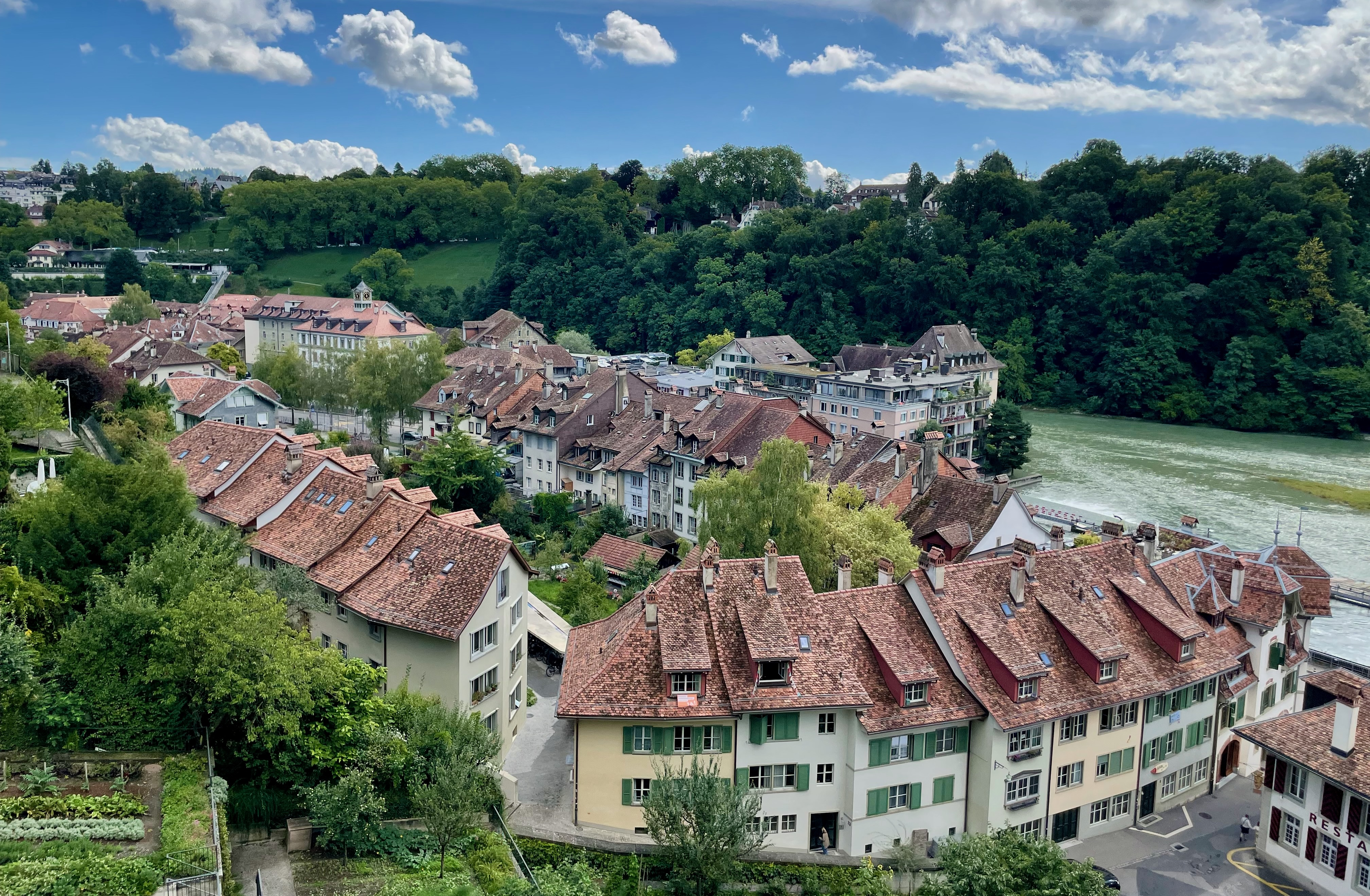
Rooftops of the Mattequartier seen from the Münsterplattform

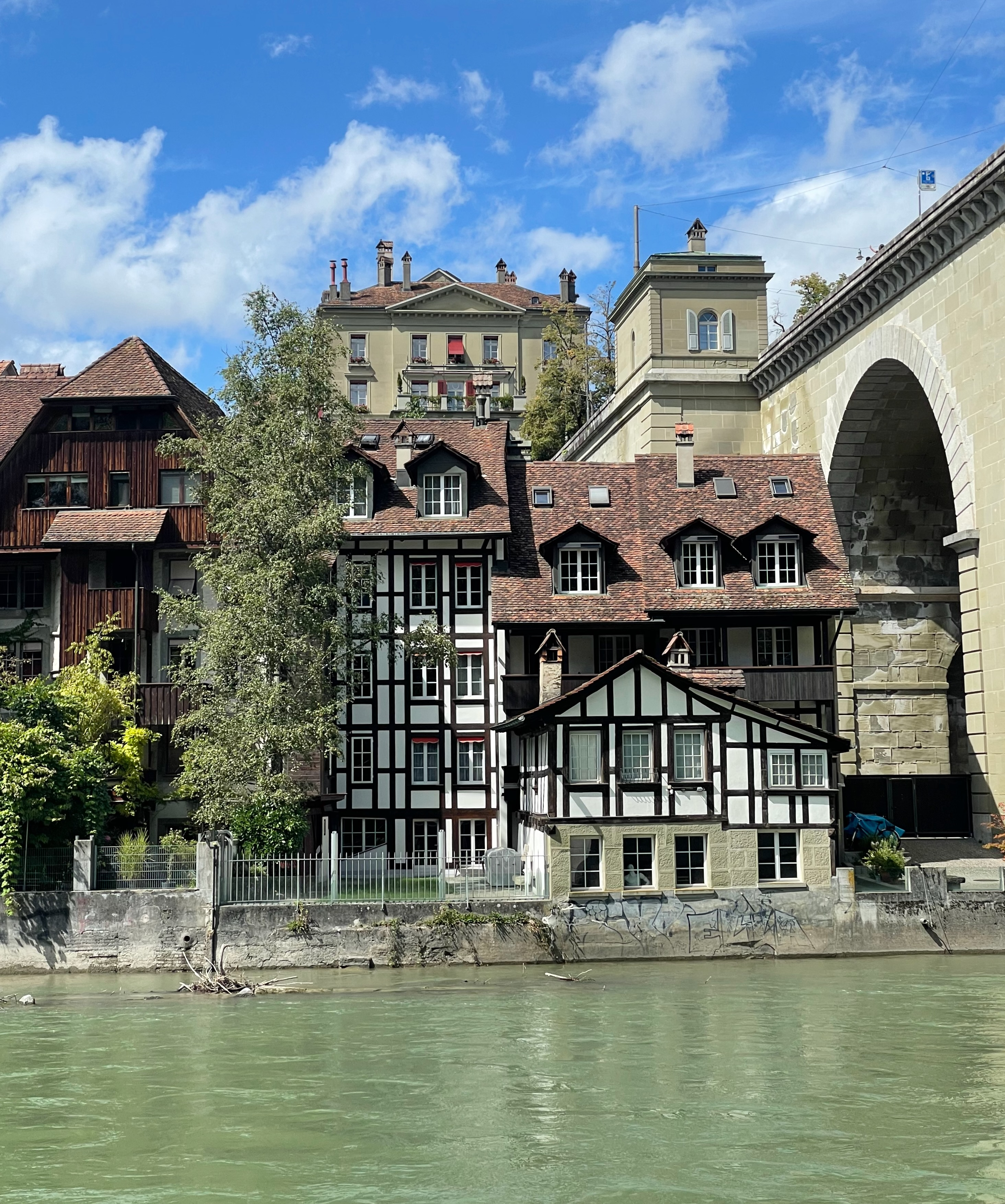
Timber-frame houses in the Mattequartier

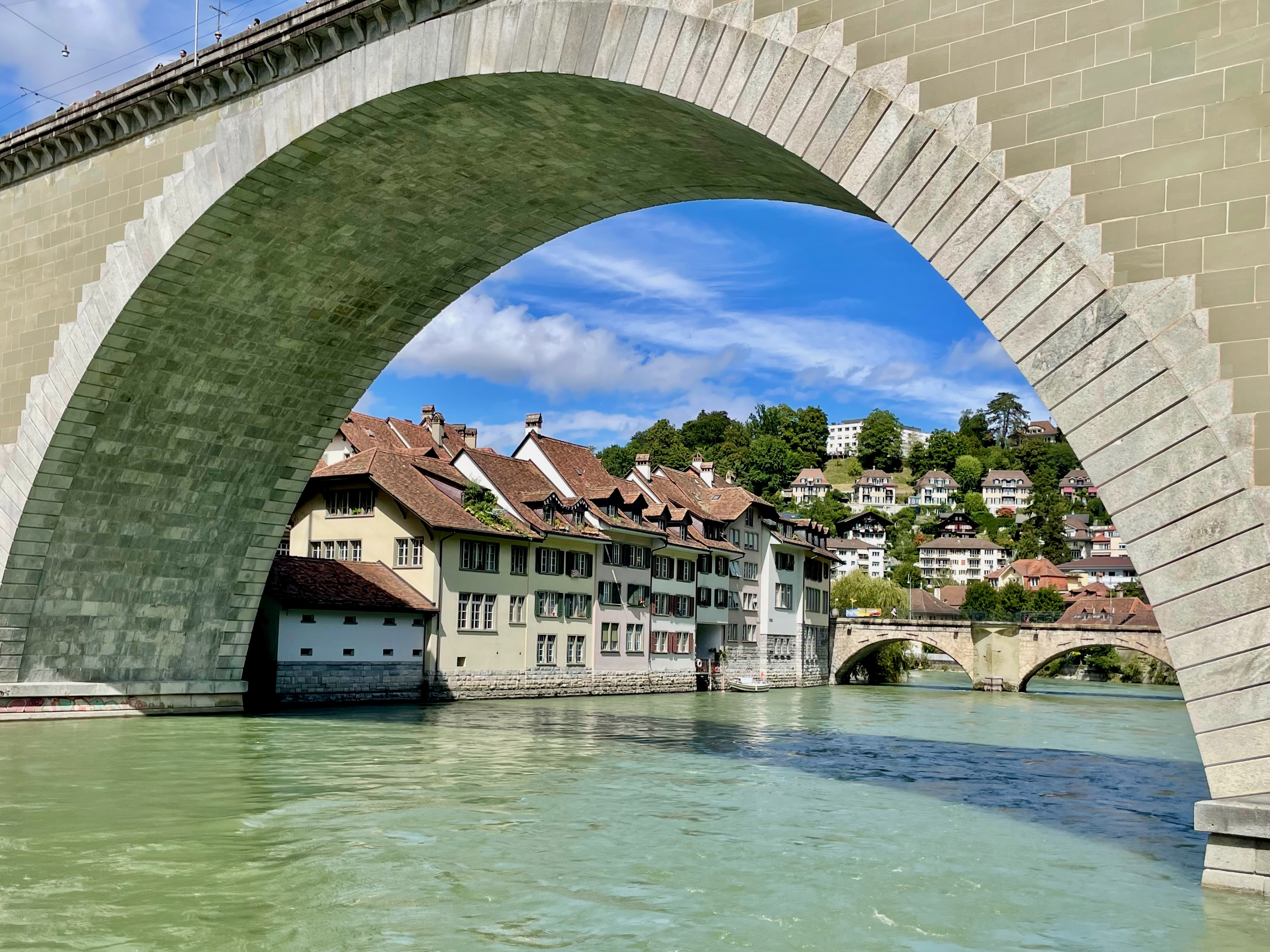
Mattequartier on the Aare riverfront, viewed from beneath the Nydeggbrücke

== See also ==
- List of cultural property of national significance in Switzerland: Bern
- Nydeggbrücke
