= Franz Müller (physician) =

Swiss physician (1805–1883)

- Born: 19 March 1805; Altdorf, Uri, Switzerland
- Died: 26 December 1883 (aged 78); Altdorf, Uri, Switzerland
- Occupations: Physician; politician
- Spouses: Waldburga Müller (m. 1831) Heinrica Nager (m. 1853)
- Parents: Karl Martin Müller (father); Waldburga Bessler (mother)
- Relatives: Karl Emanuel Müller (brother-in-law)

Franz Müller (19 March 1805 – 26 December 1883) was a Swiss physician and conservative politician from Altdorf in the canton of Uri. He had a medical practice in Altdorf from 1830 to 1871, presided over the hospital administration of Altdorf and sat on the education council. He also did basic and source-based research in meteorology, history and dialectology.

== Biography ==
Franz Müller was born on 19 March 1805 in Altdorf, the son of Karl Martin Müller and Waldburga née Bessler. In 1831 he married Waldburga née Müller, daughter of Anton Maria Müller, a cantonal clerk (Landschreiber). He was the brother-in-law of Karl Emanuel Müller. In 1853 he married Heinrica Nager, daughter of Adalbert Nager, a Talammann (chief magistrate of a valley).

Müller attended the Gymnasium in Altdorf and the lyceum in Solothurn, and he studied medicine in Freiburg im Breisgau and Göttingen. From 1830 to 1871 he had a medical practice in Altdorf.

From 1868 to 1874 Müller was president of the hospital administration (Spitalverwaltung) of Altdorf, and from 1864 to 1882 he was a member of the education council (Erziehungsrat). A conservative politician, he also did basic and source-based research (grundlagen- und quellenbezogene Forschungen) in meteorology, history and dialectology. He died in Altdorf on 26 December 1883.

== Works ==
- "Die Urkunden des Landes Uri bezüglich auf die Abtei Zürich, von 1248–1428", in Der Geschichtsfreund, 9, 1853, 3–29

== Bibliography ==
- I. Müller, "Dr. Franz Müller (1805–83)", in Historisches Neujahrsblatt (Uri), new series 32/33, 1977/78, 121–154
- H. Stadler-Planzer, Karl Emanuel Müller, 1999, 110–114
