= Church of St. Peter and Paul, Bern =

Church of St. Peter and Paul
- Kirche St. Peter und Paul
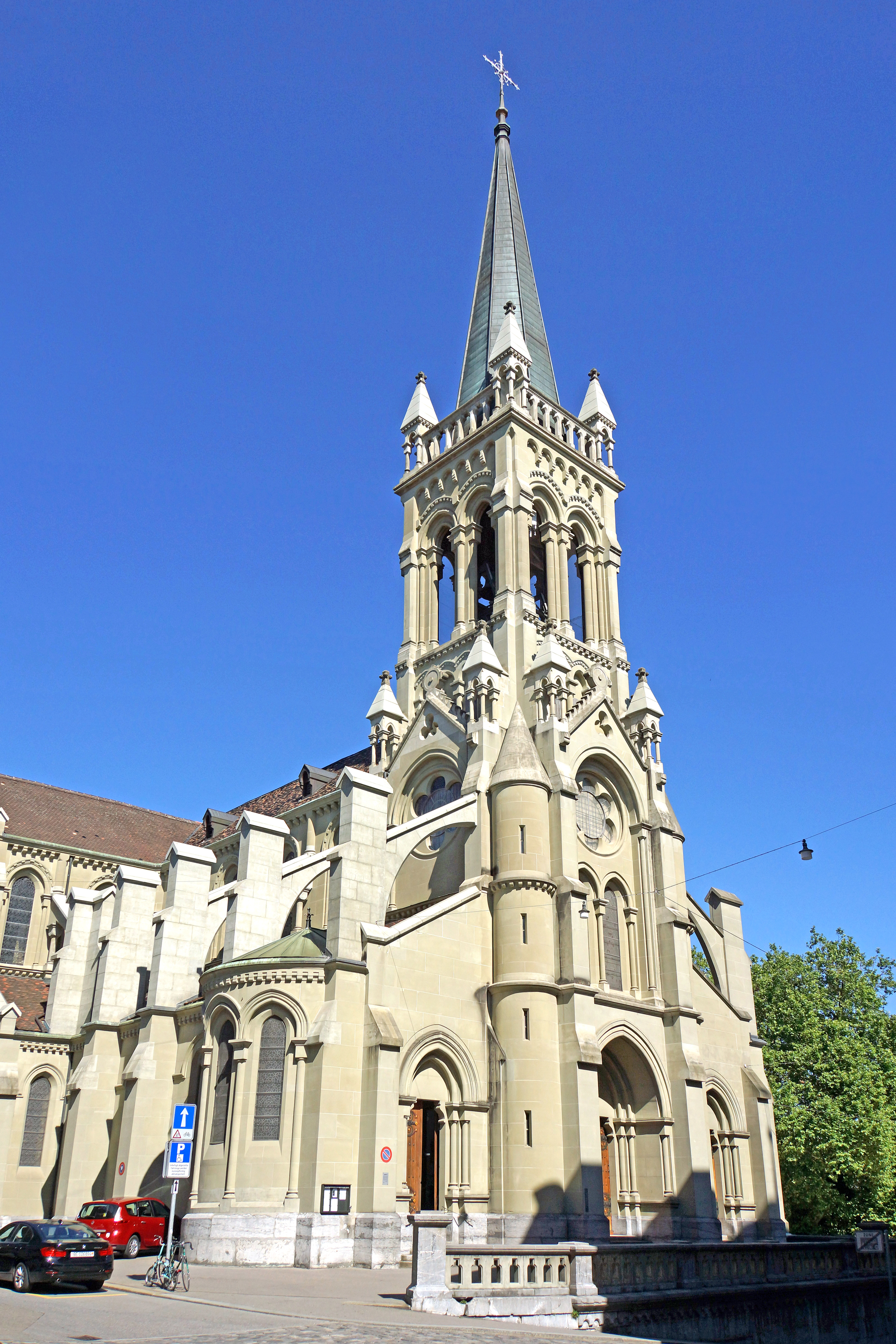
- Church of St. Peter and Paul

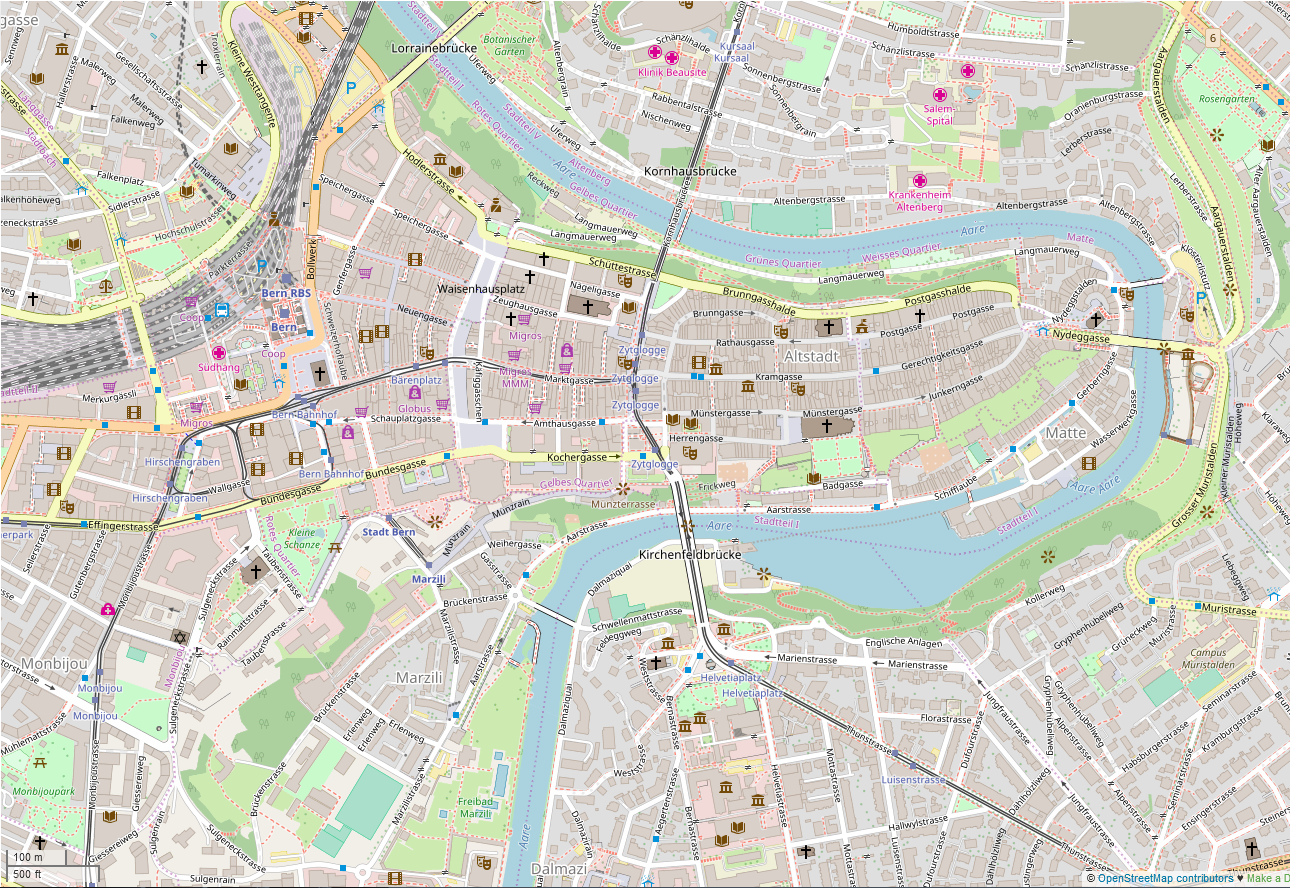
- Location within Switzerland Location within Canton of Bern Location within Bern
- 46°56′55.38″N 7°27′5.55″E
- Location: Bern
- Country: Switzerland
- Denomination: Christian Catholic Church of Switzerland
- Previous denomination: Roman Catholic
- Website: www.christkath-bern.ch/kirche-st-peter-und-paul/

History
- Status: Cathedral and parish church

Architecture
- Functional status: Active
- Architect(s): Pierre Joseph Edmond Deperthes and H. Marchal
- Style: Romanesque and Gothic Revival
- Groundbreaking: 1858
- Completed: 1864

Swiss Cultural Property of National Significance

The Church of St. Peter and Paul is a Christian Catholic church in Bern, Switzerland. It is designated as a Cultural Property of National Significance

== History ==
During the Protestant Reformation in the early 16th century, the city of Bern adopted the new Protestant faith and the city's churches converted, leaving the remaining Catholics in Bern without a church. Over the following centuries, they remained without a church in the city. Following the French invasion of Switzerland in 1798 and the political reforms of the Helvetic Republic, the catholic community of Bern held mass in the choir of the Bern Minster until 1803. Beginning in 1804 they moved to the French Church on Zeughausgasse.

The Church of St. Peter and Paul was begun in 1858 as the first Catholic church built in Bern since the Reformation. It was built next to the Town Hall of Bern, on the site of the St. Johannsen granary (which had been built over the ruins of a mint which burnt to the ground in 1787). The church was designed by H Marchal and Pierre-Joseph Edmond Deperthes in the style of the Romanesque and French cathedral Gothic. Construction began in 1858 under the supervision of Emmanuel Müller and was completed in 1864. The first mass was celebrated in the church on 13 November 1864. Following the First Vatican Council (1869-1870) some Catholics in Switzerland were dissatisfied with the Council and split away from the church to form the Christian Catholic Church of Switzerland. In 1875, the Church of St. Peter and Paul became the parish church of the Old Catholic congregation in Bern.

In 1965-67 the bell tower and south facade were renovated, followed by several additional renovations.
