= Franz Xaver Arnold =

Swiss politician (1774–1841)

- Born: 1 December 1774; Probably Altdorf, Uri, Old Swiss Confederacy
- Died: 7 August 1841 (aged 66); Altdorf, Uri, Switzerland
- Occupations: Landowner; politician
- Spouse: Katharina Schillig (m. 1807)
- Father: Josef Anton Arnold
- Relatives: Josef Anton Arnold (brother)

Franz Xaver Arnold (1 December 1774 – 7 August 1841) was a Swiss politician from Altdorf in the canton of Uri. A rich landowner and rentier, he was Landammann of Uri from 1832 to 1834. During his term of office, in 1833, Uri rejected the draft revision of the Federal Treaty.

== Biography ==
Franz Xaver Arnold was born on 1 December 1774, probably in Altdorf, the son of Josef Anton Arnold, a councillor (Ratsherr), innkeeper and wine merchant. His brother was Josef Anton Arnold. In 1807 he married Katharina Schillig, daughter of Franz Josef Schillig, a merchant (Handelsmann).

Arnold was a rich landowner and rentier. In 1822 he became a councillor (Ratsherr). From 1829 to 1832 he was deputy Landammann (Landesstatthalter), and from 1832 to 1834 Landammann of Uri. During his term of office, in 1833, Uri rejected the draft of a federal revision (Bundesrevision). He died in Altdorf on 7 August 1841.

== Bibliography ==
- U. Kälin, Die Urner Magistratenfamilien, 1991
