= Nydegg =

Quarter in Bern, Switzerland

Coordinates: 46°56′55.9″N 7°27′27.6″E

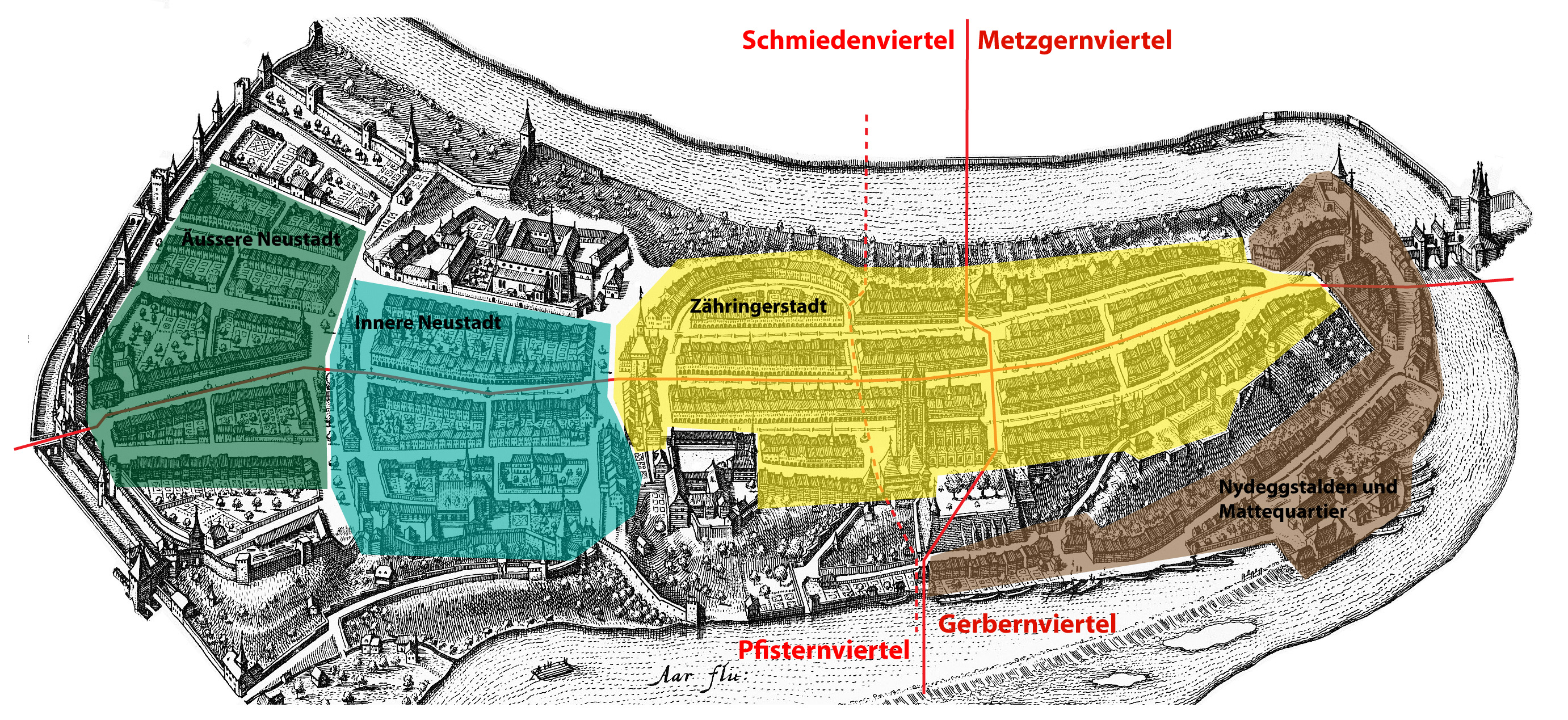
The Viertel and Quartiere of the old city. (click to enlarge)

The Nydegg is a historic section in the Old City of Bern in Bern, Switzerland.

The first expansion of Bern occurred as the city was founded in 1191. At the east end of the central and oldest neighbourhood, the Zähringerstadt (Zähringer town), was the Nydegg castle near the banks of the Aare river. The houses that grew up around the castle were the start of the Nydegg section. Around 1268 Nydegg Castle was destroyed, and the city expanded into the area formerly occupied by the castle.

Situated in the northeast of the Aare peninsula, the Nydegg together with the Mattequartier in the southwest constituted medieval Bern's smallest neighbourhood. Workshops and mercantile activity prevailed in this area, and medieval sources tell of numerous complaints about the ceaseless and apparently nerve-wracking noise of machinery, carts and commerce. The Matte area at the riverside features three artificial channels, through which Aare water was diverted to power three city-owned watermills built in 1360. In the early 20th century, a small hydroelectric plant was built in that location. Nearby, the busy Schiffländte (ship landing-place) allowed for the reloading of goods transported by boat up and down the river.
