= Karl Martin Müller =

Swiss officer and politician (1767–1831)

- Born: 14 September 1767; Naples, Kingdom of Naples
- Died: 29 April 1831 (aged 63); Altdorf, Uri, Switzerland
- Occupations: Officer; businessman; politician
- Spouses: Waldburga Bessler (m. 1802) Franziska von Hettlingen (m. 1809)
- Children: Franz Müller
- Parents: Karl Franz Müller (father); Friederika Bessler (mother)

Karl Martin Müller (14 September 1767 – 29 April 1831) was a Swiss officer, businessman and politician from the canton of Uri. He served in the Tschudi guards regiment in Neapolitan service from 1783, rising to the rank of captain, and returned to Uri in 1798. He owned the brickworks in Flüelen and the hospital mill in Altdorf and was a partner in the wine trading company Müller & Bessler. From 1809 to 1811 he was Landammann of Uri.

== Biography ==
Karl Martin Müller was born on 14 September 1767 in Naples, the son of Karl Franz Müller and Friederika Bessler. In 1802 he married Waldburga Bessler, daughter of Karl Alfons Bessler, and in 1809 Franziska von Hettlingen, daughter of Johann Victor Laurenz von Hettlingen. His son was the physician Franz Müller.

Müller attended the Latin school in Altdorf. In 1783 he joined the Tschudi guards regiment (Garderegiment Tschudi) in Neapolitan service as a cadet, and he was promoted to captain in it. In 1798 he returned to Uri.

Müller owned the brickworks (Ziegelhütte) in Flüelen and the hospital mill (Spitalmühle) in Altdorf, and he was a partner in the wine trading company Müller & Bessler. In 1804 he became cantonal major (Landesmajor). From 1804 to 1807 he was treasurer of Uri (Landessäckelmeister), from 1808 to 1809 deputy Landammann (Landesstatthalter) and from 1809 to 1811 Landammann. He died in Altdorf on 29 April 1831.

== Bibliography ==
- A. Müller, "Frau Landammann Maria Josepha Müller-Brand", in Historisches Neujahrsblatt (Uri), 27, 1921, 11–45
- U. Kälin, Die Urner Magistratenfamilien, 1991
