= Felsenau Power Plant =

Hydroelectric power plant in Bern, Switzerland

Coordinates: 46.9688°N 7.4391°E

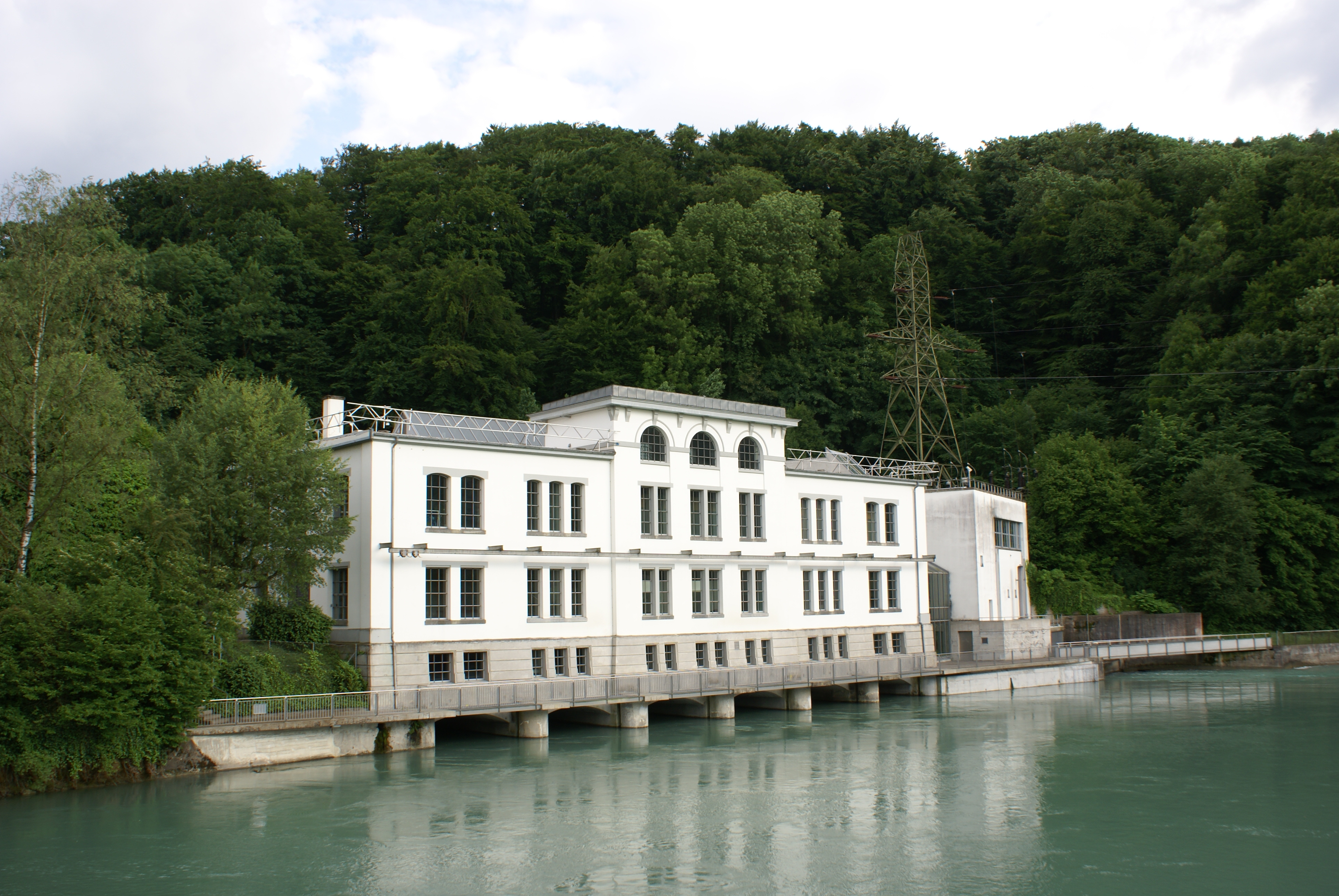
The Felsenau power plant.

The Felsenau power plant (German: Kraftwerk Felsenau) is a hydroelectric power plant located on the river Aar in Bern, Switzerland. It was built in 1909 by the city's utility company, Energie Wasser Bern. After a 1989 modernisation, the turbine hall is now used as a museum. The plant's current power output is 11.5 megawatts.

The main building was designed by Eduard Locher and Alfred Brunschwyler in a then-popular historicising style as a "palace of technology". The 1989 expansion is by Vladimir Grossen and Bea Baumann.
