= Karl H. Müller =

Austrian social scientist

Karl H. Müller (born 1953) is an Austrian social scientist, and director of the Steinbeis Transfer Center New Cybernetics in Vienna. He is particularly known for his 2005 work with J. Rogers Hollingsworth on "Advancing Socio-Economics: An Institutionalist Perspective"

== Life and work ==
Müller obtained his MA and PhD degree in philosophy and economics during his studies at the University of Graz, the University of Pittsburgh, the University of Vienna and the University of Bologna from 1972 to 1983.

Müller began his academic career in 1984 at the Institute for Advanced Studies (IHS) in Vienna, where from 1997 to 2001 he chaired the Departments of Political Science and Sociology, and from 2001 to 2014 the Wiener Institute for Social Science Documentation and Methodology (WISDOM). Since 2014 he is director of the Steinbeis Transfer Centre New Cybernetics in Vienna and is also President of the Heinz von Foerster Society.

Müller's research interests are "complex modeling in the social sciences, new science of cybernetics and renewals of radical constructivism, potential interdisciplinary and transdisciplinary research... in the field of economy, science and society."

== Selected publications ==
- Hollingsworth, Joseph Rogers, Karl H. Müller, Ellen Jane Hollingsworth (2005) Advancing Socio-Economics: An Institutionalist Perspective. Lanham, Maryland: Rowman & Littlefield Publishers.
- Albert Müller and Karl H. Müller (eds.) An Unfinished Revolution? Heinz von Foerster and the Biological Computer Laboratory BCL 1958–1976. Vienna, Austria: edition echoraum. 2007.
- Karl H. Müller (2008), The New Science of Cybernetics. The Evolution of Living Research Designs, vol. I: Methodology. Vienna, Austria: edition echoraum.

Articles, a selection:

- Mueller, K. "Towards a General Methodology for Second-Order Science." Systemics, Cybernetics And Informatics 12.5 (2014): 33-42.
