= Nydeggbrücke =

Bridge in Bern, Switzerland which connects the old city to the new part

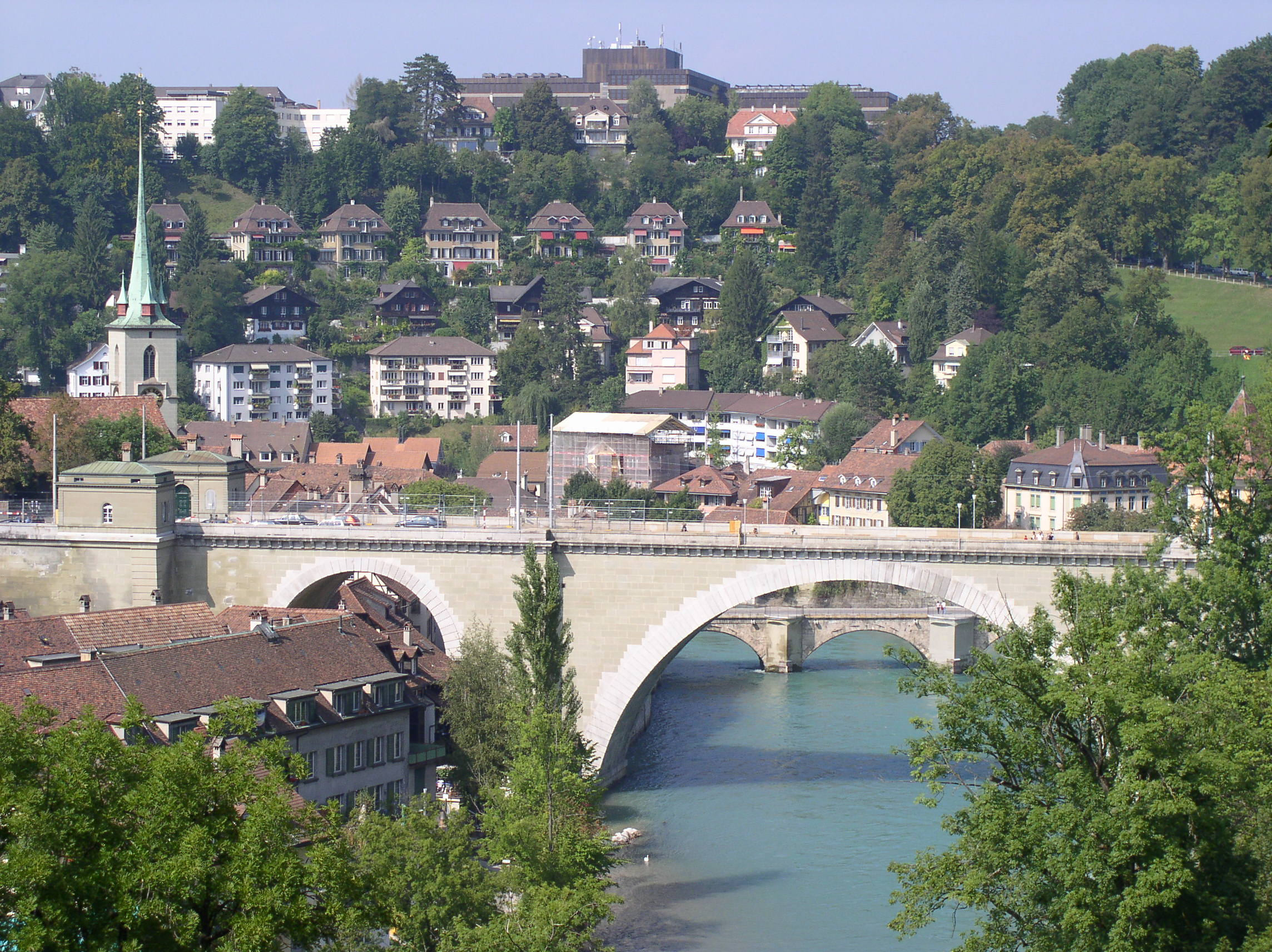
- Nydeggbrücke with the Untertorbrücke behind it, looking North.
- Coordinates: 46°56′54″N 7°27′32″E
- Carries: Two lanes and sidewalks
- Crosses: Aare
- Locale: Bern, Switzerland

Characteristics
- Design: Arched lintel bridge
- Material: Freestone
- Total length: 190 m (620 ft)
- Width: 10.5 m (34 ft), center 7.5 m (25 ft)
- Height: 25 m (82 ft)
- Longest span: 46 m (151 ft)
- No. of spans: 3
- Piers in water: 2

History
- Designer: Karl Emanuel Müller
- Construction start: 1840
- Construction end: 1844
- Construction cost: 1,650,000 Franks

Location
- Interactive map of Nydeggbrücke

The Nydeggbrücke is a bridge in Bern, Switzerland, which connects the eastern part of the old city to the new part. It crosses over the Aare and is located very close to the Bärengraben. It was built in parallel to the Untertorbrücke in 1840, which until then had been the only bridge crossing the Aare. The Nydeggbrücke is in total 190 meters long and took three years to build. It is a Swiss heritage site of national significance.

== History ==
Following a three-year planning phase on 7 July 1840 the city appointed Karl Emanuel Müller as the lead engineer on the Nydegg Bridge project. Starting in August 1840, crews worked throughout the winter of 1840/41 to build coffer dams and prepare the foundations for the bridge pillars. Despite severe floods and other delays by May 1841 the pillars were in place and above water level. The cornerstone ceremony took place in early June of the same year. In the fall of 1841 construction began on the eastern side arch and by the following fall both the western and eastern side arches were finished. With the side arches finished, in the winter of 1842 workers began building the scaffolding for the larger central arch. By the summer of 1843, the central arch was completed and on 14–15 September 1843 the placing of the keystone was celebrated with cannon fire, speeches and a feast. With major construction completed, the scaffolding was dismantled and work began on the decoration and roadway on the bridge. On 23 November 1844 the bridge was dedicated with a celebration attended by the entire city. The entire project cost about 1,650,000 Franks.

On 1 March 1853, a portion of the 1848 Swiss Federal Constitution came into effect and removed all internal tolls on travel and trade. The toll houses on the Nydegg bridge were closed and the canton took over ownership of the bridge. In 1850, the Tiefenaubrücke was built. The newer bridge and the railroad quickly became the preferred routes into the city, while the Nydegg bridge was only used for local traffic. This changed in the 1920s when the city expanded to the southeast and the Nydegg bridge once again became a popular route into the city.

== Bridge construction ==
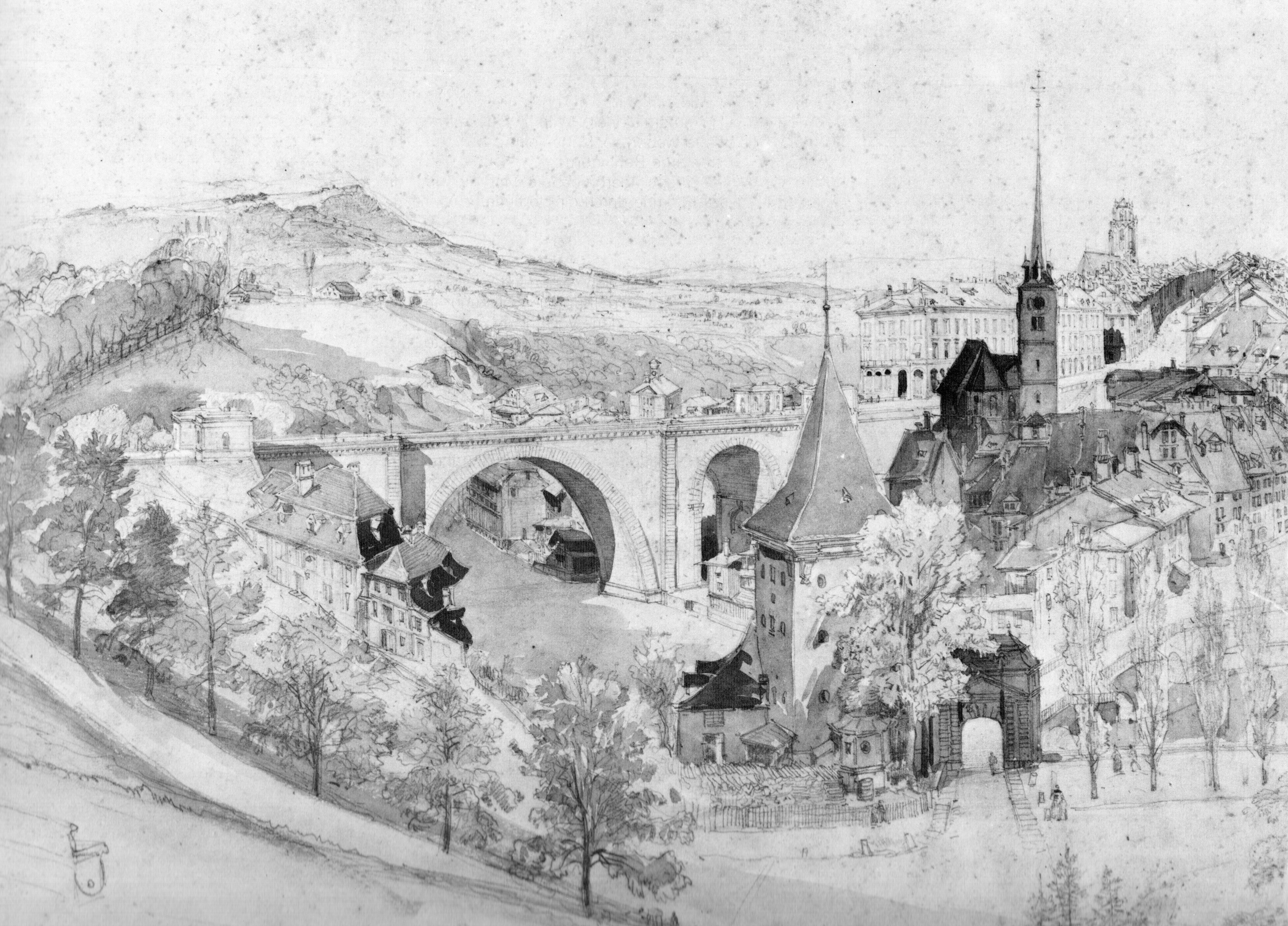
Sketch of the Nydeggbrücke in 1850. Looking southwest from across the Aare toward the Old City of Bern

The Nydegg bridge is a freestone structure with three arches over the Aare. The bridge was built with a core of Merlinger and Jura Mountains limestone (from Solothurn) and then clad with blue sandstone from nearby Ostermundigen. The top of the bridge is 25 m (82 ft) above the average river level. The larger central arch is 46 m (151 ft) wide while the two side arches are both 16.5 m (54 ft). Until the 1890s, the large central arch was the largest in Europe. The entire bridge is 190 m (620 ft) long. At both ends of the structure, it is 10.5 m (34 ft) wide. However, the bridge narrows in the center and is only 7.5 m (25 ft) wide for a distance of 124.3 m (408 ft) over the center of the river. The pillars that support the central arch are 14 m (46 ft) wide.

== See also ==
- List of Aare bridges in Bern
