= Karl Emanuel Müller =

Swiss engineer and politician

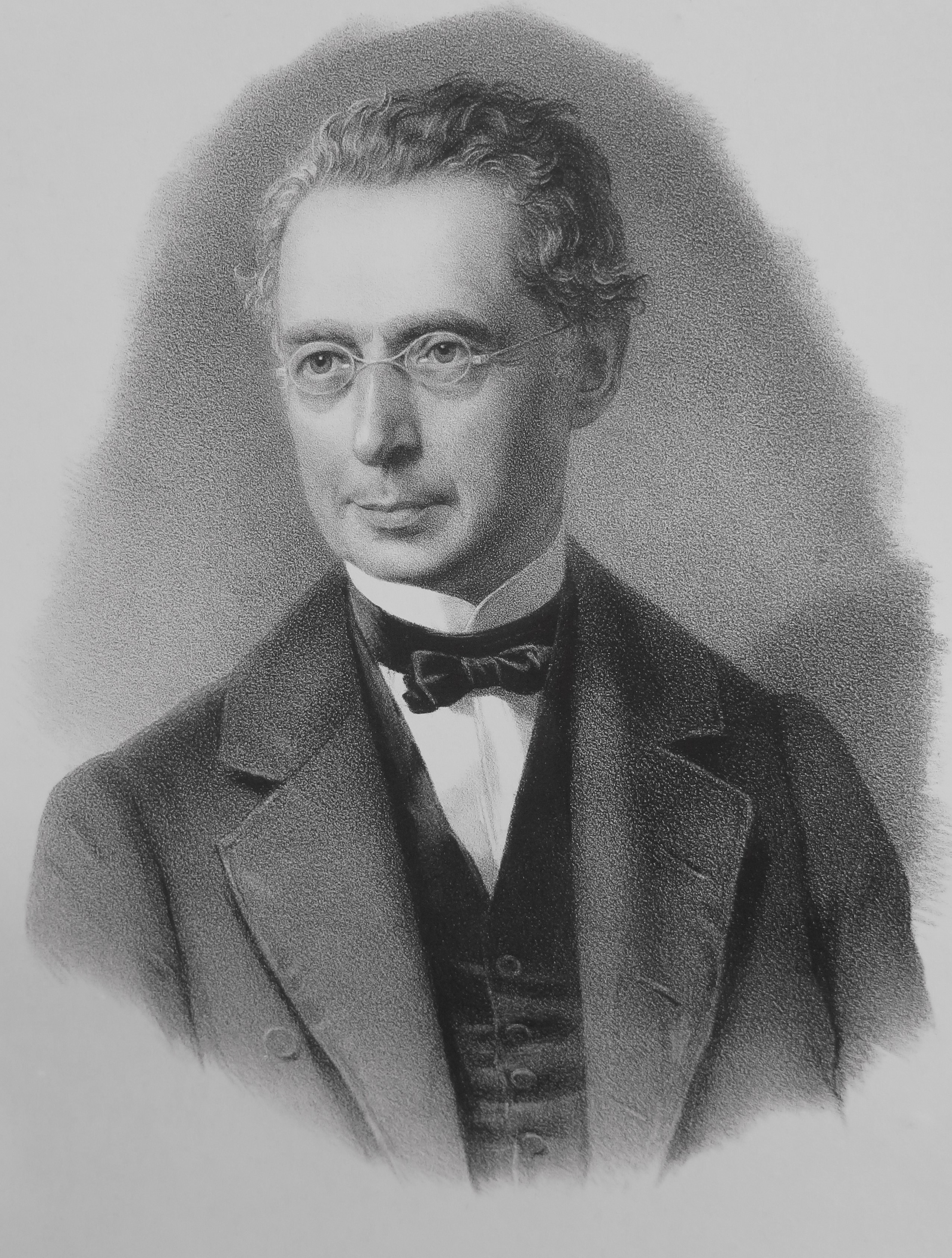
- Lithograph, 1871
- Born: 18 March 1804; Altdorf, Uri, Switzerland
- Died: 1 December 1869 (aged 65); Altdorf, Uri, Switzerland
- Occupations: Engineer; entrepreneur; politician
- Spouses: Josefa Arnold (m. 1844) Emilie Schnyder von Wartensee (m. 1851)
- Parents: Anton Maria Müller (father); Elisabeth Mailfaire (mother)
- Relatives: Josef Anton Arnold (father-in-law); Franz Müller (brother-in-law); Julius Schnyder von Wartensee (brother-in-law)

Karl Emanuel Müller (18 March 1804 – 1 December 1869) was a Swiss engineer, entrepreneur and politician from Altdorf in the canton of Uri. As a contractor he built, among other works, the carriage road through the Schöllenen, the Nydegg Bridge and the church of St. Peter and Paul in Bern. In the Sonderbund War he led the Gotthard expedition. He was Landammann of Uri in 1856–1859 and 1864–1866 and a member of the Council of States in 1861–1863. He is regarded as the first industrial entrepreneur of Uri.

== Biography ==
Karl Emanuel Müller was born on 18 March 1804 in Altdorf, the son of Anton Maria Müller, a cantonal clerk (Landschreiber), and Elisabeth Mailfaire of Saarlouis, which was part of France until 1815. In 1844 he married Josefa Arnold, daughter of Josef Anton Arnold. In 1851 he married Emilie Schnyder von Wartensee, daughter of Ludwig Schnyder von Wartensee, a landowner in Lucerne and Sursee. He was the brother-in-law of Franz Müller and of Julius Schnyder von Wartensee.

Müller attended the Latin school in Altdorf and the lyceum in Solothurn. He studied political science (Staatswissenschaften) in Heidelberg, and from 1826 to 1829 architecture and engineering (building construction, hydraulic engineering and bridge building) in Vienna. He made study trips to England and Italy.

From 1839 to 1840 Müller was road inspector of the canton of Glarus. As a contractor (Unternehmer) he built, among other works, the carriage road through the Schöllenen (1828–1830), the Nydegg Bridge in Bern (1840–1844) and the church of St. Peter and Paul in Bern (1858–1864). From 1850 to 1853 he also carried out the correction of the Reuss between Attinghausen and Seedorf.

In 1847 Müller founded the mail steamship company (Postdampfschiffgesellschaft), which fought bitterly over transport rights with the steamship company of Kasimir Friedrich Knörr of Lucerne, until the Confederation passed the law on free traffic on the lake in 1849. In 1851 he acquired commercial properties in Isleten in order to build a paper mill there, and he was also a partner in the paper mill of Horw. As co-owner of the large estate (Herrschaft) of Czernek in Slavonia (now Cernik, Croatia) from 1858 to 1863, he ran into endless difficulties.

In 1845 Müller was elected cantonal ensign (Landesfähnrich), one of the presiding offices (Vorsitzende Ämter) of Uri. In the same year, however, he moved to Lucerne, where he was appointed to the cantonal government (Regierungsrat) as head of the building department, an office he held until 1847. In the Sonderbund War he was a member of the council of war (Kriegsrat) and led the Gotthard expedition (Gotthardexpedition). With the capitulation of Central Switzerland he became a prisoner of war of the federal troops.

After the founding of the federal state, Müller continued his political career in the canton of Uri. He was a member of the cantonal government in 1850–1852 and 1856–1869, president of the cantonal court in 1852–1856, deputy Landammann (Landesstatthalter) in 1850–1852, and Landammann in 1856–1859 and 1864–1866. From 1861 to 1863 he sat in the Council of States. In the Federal Assembly he joined the Catholic conservative right, but he also kept up many relations with liberal and Reformed contemporaries.

As a magistrate Müller promoted above all road building (the Axen, Furka and Oberalp roads) and the idea of a Gotthard railway with a tunnel between Göschenen and Airolo. He was regarded as persona gratissima by the nuncio Giuseppe Maria Bovieri, and in 1865 Pope Pius IX awarded him the Order of St. Gregory. He was a benefactor of the cantonal hospital of Uri, which he had built more or less at his own expense. Müller is regarded as the first industrial entrepreneur of Uri. He died in Altdorf on 1 December 1869.

== Bibliography ==
- E. Gruner, Die Schweizerische Bundesversammlung 1848–1920, 1, 1966, 299–300
- H. Stadler-Planzer, Karl Emanuel Müller, 1804–1869, 1999
- A. Waldis, "Karl Emanuel Müller (1804–1869)", in Schweizer Pioniere der Wirtschaft und Technik 69, 2001, 29–42

=== Archives ===
- Staatsarchiv Uri: personal papers (Nachlass)
