= J. Rogers Hollingsworth =

American historian (1932–2019)

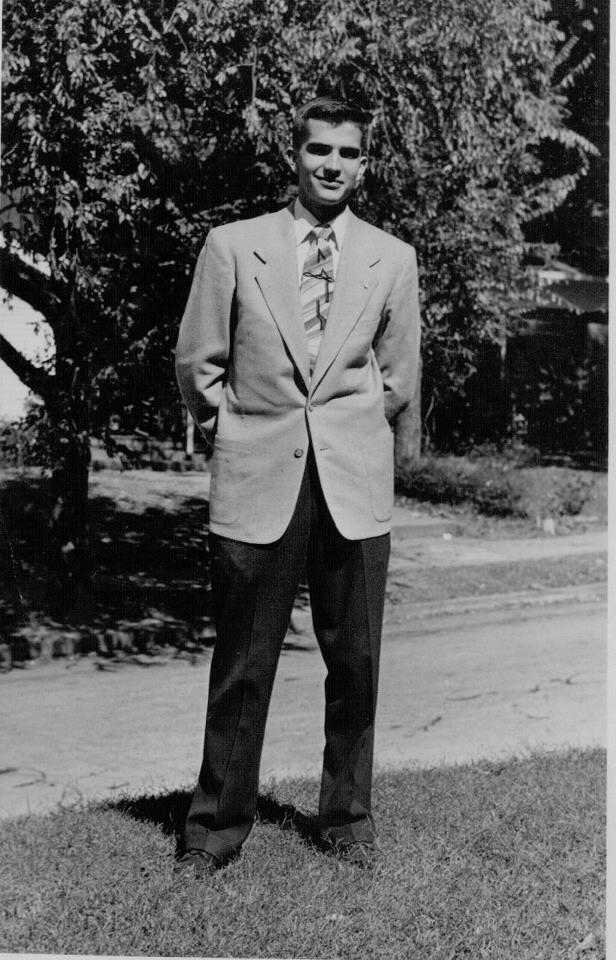
J. Rogers Hollingsworth

Joseph Rogers Hollingsworth (July 26, 1932 – October 23, 2019) was an American historian and sociologist and emeritus professor of history and sociology at the University of Wisconsin, known for his work on the governance of capitalist economies, especially the American economy.

== Life and work ==
Hollingsworth was born on July 26, 1932, in Anniston, Alabama to Efford L.M. Hollingsworth and Ila Pearl Rogers. He graduated from Anniston High School and later obtained his MA at Emory University, and in 1960 his PhD in history at the University of Chicago.

After his graduation, he started his academic career at the University of Chicago and the University of Illinois. In 1964 he moved to the University of Wisconsin in Madison, where he was appointed associate professor of history with tenure, full professor of history in 1969, and professor of sociology in 1985. He was visiting scholar at St. John’s College, Cambridge; Trinity College, Cambridge; and at the Institute for Nonlinear Science at the University of California, San Diego. At the Swedish Collegium for Advanced Study in the Social Sciences he was Torgny Segerstedt Chair. On June 2, 1995, he received an honorary doctorate from the Faculty of Humanities at Uppsala University, Sweden He was appointed fellow at the American Philosophical Society, the Netherlands Institute for Advanced Study, and at the Austrian Academy of Sciences.

Hollingsworth's later research interests were described as "an attempt to explain the reasons for variation among countries, over time, and in different research organizations in the rate at which major discoveries in biomedical science occur. He is also engaged in a cross-national and historical research project that examines why countries varied in their capacity to be innovative in science-based industries during the twentieth century."

== Selected publications ==
- Campbell, John L., J. Rogers Hollingsworth, and Leon N. Lindberg. Governance of the American economy. Vol. 5. Cambridge University Press, 1991.
- Hollingsworth, J. Rogers, Philippe C. Schmitter, and Wolfgang Streeck. Governing capitalist economies: Performance and control of economic sectors. OUP, 1994.
- Hollingsworth, J. Rogers, and Robert Boyer. Contemporary capitalism: The embeddedness of institutions. Cambridge University Press, 1997.
- Hollingsworth, Joseph Rogers Karl H. Müller, Ellen Jane Hollingsworth (2005) Advancing Socio-Economics: An Institutionalist Perspective.

Articles, a selection:

- Hollingsworth, J. Rogers. "Doing institutional analysis: implications for the study of innovations." Review of International Political Economy 7.4 (2000): 595–644.
- Hage, Jerald, and J. Rogers Hollingsworth. "A strategy for the analysis of idea innovation networks and institutions." Organization Studies 21.5 (2000): 971–1004.
