= Karl Franz Müller =

Swiss officer and politician (1738–1797)

- Born: 4 October 1738; Naples, Kingdom of Naples
- Died: 2 September 1797 (aged 58); Altdorf, Uri, Old Swiss Confederacy
- Occupations: Officer; military entrepreneur; politician
- Spouses: Friederika Bessler; Maria Josepha Brand (m. 1768)
- Children: Karl Martin Müller
- Parents: Karl Franz Müller (father); Ursula Jauch (mother)

Karl Franz Müller (4 October 1738 – 2 September 1797) was a Swiss officer and politician from the canton of Uri. He was a captain and military entrepreneur in Neapolitan service and Landammann of Uri from 1774 to 1776.

== Biography ==
Karl Franz Müller was born on 4 October 1738 in Naples, the son of Karl Franz Müller, a colonel in Neapolitan service, and Ursula Jauch. His first wife was Friederika Bessler, daughter of Friedrich Alfons Bessler von Wattingen. In 1768 he married Maria Josepha Brand. His son with Friederika Bessler was Karl Martin Müller.

Müller was a captain and military entrepreneur (Militärunternehmer) in Neapolitan service. In 1764 he became cantonal advocate (Landesfürsprecher) of Uri and in 1766 cantonal ensign (Landesfähnrich). From 1774 to 1776 he was Landammann of Uri. He died on 2 September 1797 in Altdorf.

== Bibliography ==
- A. Müller, "Frau Landammann Maria Josepha Müller-Brand", in Historisches Neujahrsblatt (Uri), 27, 1921, 11–45
