= Timeline of Bern =

The following is a timeline of the history of the municipality of Bern, Switzerland.

== Prior to 19th century ==
- 2nd-3rd century CE – Roman settlement abandoned.
- 1191 – Bern set up as military outpost by Berthold V, Duke of Zähringen.
- 1218 – Bern becomes a free imperial city of the Holy Roman Empire.
- 1219 – Zytglogge (tower) built.
- 1223 – Theto von Ravensburg becomes Schultheiss von Bern.
- 1256 – Käfigturm (tower) built.
- 1259 – First mention of Jews in Bern.
- 1268 – Nydegg Castle demolished (approximate date).
- 1270 – Felsenburg (castle) built (approximate date).
- 1285 – Predigerkirche (Bern) (church) built.
- 1289 – April: Battle of Schosshalde takes place; Bern successfully resisted Rudolph of Hapsburg.
- 1298
  - Bern allies with Biel, Murten, and Solothurn.
  - Bern expands to include Bolligen, Muri, Stettlen, and Vechigen.
- 1331-1333 – Gümmenenkrieg (Fribourg-Bern war).
- 1339 – Battle of Laupen.
- 1345 – Golatenmatttor (tower) built.
- 1346
  - Black Death plague.
  - Äussere Neustadt area developed.
  - Christoffelturm (tower) and Nydeggkirche (church) built.
- 1348-49 – Pogroms and persecution of the Jews in Bern following the Black Death.
- 1353 – Canton of Bern joins the Swiss Confederacy.
- 1380 – Public clock installed (approximate date).
- 1383-1384 – Burgdorferkrieg (Kyberg-Bern war) takes place in the County of Burgundy.
- 1406 – Construction begins of current Town hall of Bern.
- 1417 – Bern Town Hall (town hall) built.
- 1421 – Bern Munster construction begins.
- 1430 – Konrad Justinger writes Chronik der Stadt Bern, a history of the city.
- 1470 – Tschachtlanchronik (Bern history) compiled.
- 1489 – Untertorbrücke (bridge) built.
- 1494 – Antoniterkirche (Bern) (church) rebuilt.
- 1513 – Town begins to keep bears in the Bärenplatz.
- 1525 – Printing press in operation.
- 1528 – Bern Disputation.
- 1530 – Astronomical clock installed in the Zytglogge.
- 1532 – Bernese Synod adopted.
- 1543 – Gerechtigkeitsbrunnen (Bern) (fountain) erected on Gerechtigkeitsgasse.
- 1544 – Simsonbrunnen (fountain) erected.
- 1546 – Fountains Anna-Seiler-Brunnen (on Marktgasse) and Pfeiferbrunnen (on Spitalgasse) erected.
- 1573 – Munster construction ends.
- 1615 – Schallenhaus (prison) in operation.
- 1689 – newspaper Gazette de Berne starts to be printed.
- 1700 – Population: 14,219.
- 1718 – Kornhaus (Bern) (granary) built.
- 1720 – Bern banking crisis of 1720
- 1729 – Church of the Holy Ghost, Bern rebuilt.
- 1752 – Erlacherhof (mansion) built.
- 1759 – Ökonomische Gesellschaft (scientific society) founded.
- 1798 – 5 March: Battle of Grauholz takes place in canton; French in power.
- 1799 – Stämpfli (publisher) in business.

== 19th century ==
- 1803 – City library active.
- 1815 – Bernischen Musikgesellschaft (music society) founded.
- 1817 – Rathaus zum Äusseren Stand (government building) rebuilt.
- 1818 – Population: 18,997.
- 1830 – Eidgenössisches Schützenfest held in Bern.
- 1832
  - Karl Zeerleder becomes mayor.
  - Canton becomes administratively independent of city.
- 1834 – University of Bern established.
- 1837 – Population: 24,362.
- 1844 – Nydeggbrücke (bridge) built.
- 1846
  - Jews granted freedom of establishment in the canton.
  - Historical Society of the Canton of Bern founded.
- 1848 – Bern becomes capital of Switzerland.
- 1850
  - Der Bund newspaper begins publication.
  - Population: 29,670 in city; 407,765 in canton.
- 1851 – Tiefenaubrücke (bridge) built.
- 1857 – Federal Palace of Switzerland and Bärengraben (bear pit) built.
- 1858
  - Bern railway station opens.
  - Musikschule Konservatorium Bern founded.
- 1863 – Bernischen Juristenverein (lawyers' association) founded.
- 1864 – Catholic Church of St. Peter and Paul, Bern built.
- 1868 – Chocolat Tobler in business.
- 1874
  - International Weltpostkongress 1874 (postal union meeting) held in Bern; "Treaty concerning the formation of a General Postal Union" signed.
  - Christian Catholic Church of Switzerland headquartered in Bern.
- 1877 – Bern Symphony Orchestra established.
- 1879 – Conche machine invented by chocolate maker Rodolphe Lindt.
- 1880
  - Engehalbinsel oppidum ruins discovered near city.
  - Population: 44,087 in city; 471,991 in canton.
- 1886 – International "Convention for the Protection of Literary and Artistic Works" signed in city.
- 1888 – Berner Tramway-Gesellschaft founded.
- 1891
  - August: 700th anniversary of city founding.
  - State Archive of Bern founded.
- 1893
  - June: Labour unrest.
  - Johanneskirche (Bern) (church) built.
  - Frauenkomitee Bern founded.
- 1894 – Bern Historical Museum built.
- 1900
  - Städtische Strassenbahn Bern (public transit operator) and Gutenberg Museum (Bern) established.
  - Population: 64,227.

== 20th century ==
- 1902 – Federal Palace of Switzerland building expanded.
- 1903 – Albert Einstein moves into Einsteinhaus on Kramgasse.
- 1905
  - St. Paul's Church, Bern built.
  - Akademischer Alpenclub Bern (hiking club) formed.
- 1906
  - "International Convention respecting the Prohibition of the Use of White (Yellow) Phosphorus in the Manufacture of Matches" signed in Bern.
  - Anglican St Ursula's Church, Berne built.
- 1910
  - Eidgenössisches Schützenfest and Swiss Aviation Exhibition held.
  - Population: 90,937 in city; 578,381 in canton.
- 1914 – Schweizerische Landesausstellung 1914 (national exposition) held in Bern.
- 1915 – March: International socialist anti-war women's conference held in Bern.
- 1918
  - Elfenau park now belongs to city.
  - Haupt Verlag (publisher) in business.
- 1919
  - Bümpliz becomes part of city.
  - February: Second International conference held in Bern.
- 1920 – Friedenskirche (Bern) (church) built.
- 1928 – Schweizeische Ausstellung für Frauenarbeit (women's rights event) held in Bern.
- 1929
  - Bern Aerodrome begins operating.
  - Alpar AG airline headquartered in Bern.
- 1930 – Population: 111,783 in city; 623,665 in canton.
- 1933 – Bern Trial begins.
- 1936 – National Party of Farmers, Traders and Independents headquartered in Bern.
- 1939
  - Tierpark Dählhölzli (zoo) opens.
  - Berner Zeitschrift für Geschichte und Heimatkunde (history journal) in publication.
- 1940 – Trolleybus begins operating.
- 1941- 1943 – The Bern group (Lados group) operates secretly to rescue Jews from the Holocaust.
- 1947 – Städtische Verkehrsbetriebe Bern (public transit operator) established.
- 1949
  - Zytglogge Theater founded.
  - Felsenaubrücke (bridge) and Petruskirche (Bern) (church) built.
- 1950 – Population: 146,499 in city; 731,550 in canton.
- 1951 – Burgerbibliothek of Berne (public library) foundation established.
- 1955 – February: The Romanian embassy is seized.
- 1963 – Camerata Bern founded.
- 1969 – Szeemann's art exhibit "provokes a national scandal."
- 1970 – Population: 162,405 in city; 901,706 in canton.
- 1977
  - Gurtenfestival of music begins.
  - Albert Einstein Society founded.
- 1979
  - French-speaking Canton of Jura secedes from mostly German-speaking Canton of Bern.
  - Berner Zeitung (newspaper) begins publication.
- 1982 – 6 September: Polish embassy occupied.
- 1983 – Old City of Bern designated an UNESCO World Heritage Site.
- 1984 – Regional Transport Bern-Solothurn established.
- 1990 – March: Demonstration against federal government keeping secret files on citizens.
- 1993 – Klaus Baumgartner becomes mayor.
- 1995
  - Jewish religious community of Bern recognised under public law.
  - Bern S-Bahn railway in operation.
- 2000 – Population: 128,634 in city; 957,197 in canton.

== 21st century ==
- 2002 – House of Religions founded.
- 2004 – Buskers Bern Street Music Festival begins.
- 2005
  - Paul Klee Centre built.
  - Alexander Tschäppät becomes mayor.
- 2007
  - 4 August: Kulturzentrum Reithalle bombing.
  - October: Political unrest.
- 2008 – June: UEFA Euro 2008 Group C football contest takes place in Bern.
- 2009 – Bärengraben opens.
- 2013 – Population: 137,980.

== See also ==
- History of Bern
- List of mayors of Bern
- List of cultural property of national significance in Switzerland: Bern
- Timelines of other municipalities in Switzerland: Basel, Geneva, Zürich

== Bibliography ==
in English

- William Henry Overall, ed. (1870). "Berne". Dictionary of Chronology. London: William Tegg. hdl:2027/uc2.ark:/13960/t9m32q949.
- Coolidge, William Augustus Brevoort (1911). "Bern (city)" . Encyclopædia Britannica. Vol. 3 (11th ed.). p. 795.
- "Berne". Switzerland. Grieben's Guide Books (2nd ed.). Berlin: Albert Goldschmidt. 1912. hdl:2027/uc1.$b264107.

in German

- Eduard von Rodt [in German] (1886). Bernische Stadtgeschichte (in German). Bern: Huber & Comp.
- Berchtold Weber (1976). Historisch-topographisches Lexikon der Stadt Bern (in German) – via DigiBern. (fulltext)
- Peter Meyer (ed.). Illustrierte Berner Enzyklopädie (in German) – via DigiBern. 1981-1987 (fulltext)
- J. Sulzer; et al. (1989). Stadtplanung in Bern (in German).
- "Festschrift zum 800-Jahr-Jubiläum der Stadt Bern". Berner Zeitschrift für Geschichte und Heimatkunde (in German) (53). 1991 – via ETH-Bibliothek. (fulltext)
- Ch. Lüthi; B. Meier, eds. (1998). Bern: eine Stadt bricht auf (in German).
