= Jonas Lauwiner =

Swiss politician and self-proclaimed King of the Swiss

Member of the Burgdorf City Council
- Incumbent
- Assumed office 1 January 2025

Personal details
- Born: September 15, 1994 (age 32) Unterseen, Switzerland
- Party: König Jonas Lauwiner im Dienst für die Burgdorfer
- Parents: Thomas Lauwiner (father); Habiba El-Rhaib (mother)
- Occupation: businessman, landowner, politician
- Known for: Self-proclaimed "King of Switzerland"
- Website: en.empire-gov.com

Jonas Lauwiner (born September 15, 1994) is a Swiss politician and landowner. He received international media attention in the 2020s for having acquired a number of unowned plots in Switzerland and founding the symbolic "Lauwiner Empire", self-proclaiming himself as the "King of Switzerland".

== Early life ==
Jonas Lauwiner was born to a Valaisan father from the municipality of Ried-Mörel and a Moroccan mother. He is a citizen of Switzerland and Morocco. He grew up in Bernese Oberland and in the canton of Zug.

Lauwiner completed an apprenticeship as an automation technician, with further education in business administration. He has worked as an IT manager for an American pharmaceutical company.

== Political career ==
In 2024, Lauwiner was elected to the Burgdorf legislature. However, he failed to be elected as mayor of the municipality.

Lauwiner was a candidate in March 2026 for the Grand Council and Executive Council of Bern.

== Land ownership ==
Lauwiner's interest in land ownership began when for his birthday, he received a 840 m^{2} (1,000 sq yd) plot of land in the canton of Valais from his father. When he tried to buy the neighboring plot a few years later, he discovered in the land registry that it was classified as an ownerless property. He became the owner through usucaption and began searching for other ownerless properties.

=== Lauwiner Empire ===
"Fascinated by kingdoms", Lauwiner founded the symbolic "Lauwiner Empire" on the lands he acquired. In 2019, he organised a coronation ceremony in the Nydeggkirche in Bern. Lauwiner mints his own currency, the Lauwiner Imperial Vellar. He has organised the Lauwiner Empire Legion, which describes itself as mainly conducting trainings and peacetime operations, and promises to defend Switzerland in time of war. Lauwiner owns several antique cannons, as well as a former German armoured vehicle. He has established a "palace" in a former paint factory in Oberburg, located on a 5,800m^{2} polluted plot of land. The empire is purely symbolic, and does not claim independence from Switzerland.

Lauwiner refers to his acquisitions as "campaigns". The first acquisition was in 2021, when Lauwiner acquired 50 plots of land. He has since continued such acquisitions. As of 2025, Jonas Lauwiner owned 149 plots and 83 roads, measuring at 114,000m^{2}, spread across 9 cantons, primarily in Valais and Bern, but also in Lucerne and Schwyz. His acquisitions were hampered in Lower Valais and the canton of Fribourg.

=== Controversy ===
Lauwiner has monetised his acquisitions. He has leased forests to forestry companies, or granted them harvesting rights in exchange for maintenance. He has also decided to charge tolls on the roads he owns, which has sparked outrage in the canton of Lucerne, affecting the residents of two villages. Lauwiner defended himself, citing maintenance costs and the legality of his approach. In 2025, several officials appealed to the government of Lucerne, asking it to find a solution. This brought Lauwiner considerable media attention. He has also offered Burgdorf that he would sell a street for CHF 120,000, or donate it if it were renamed "Lauwinerstrasse". (Note: Translated literally: "Lauwiner Street")
