= History of Bern =

Swiss municipal history

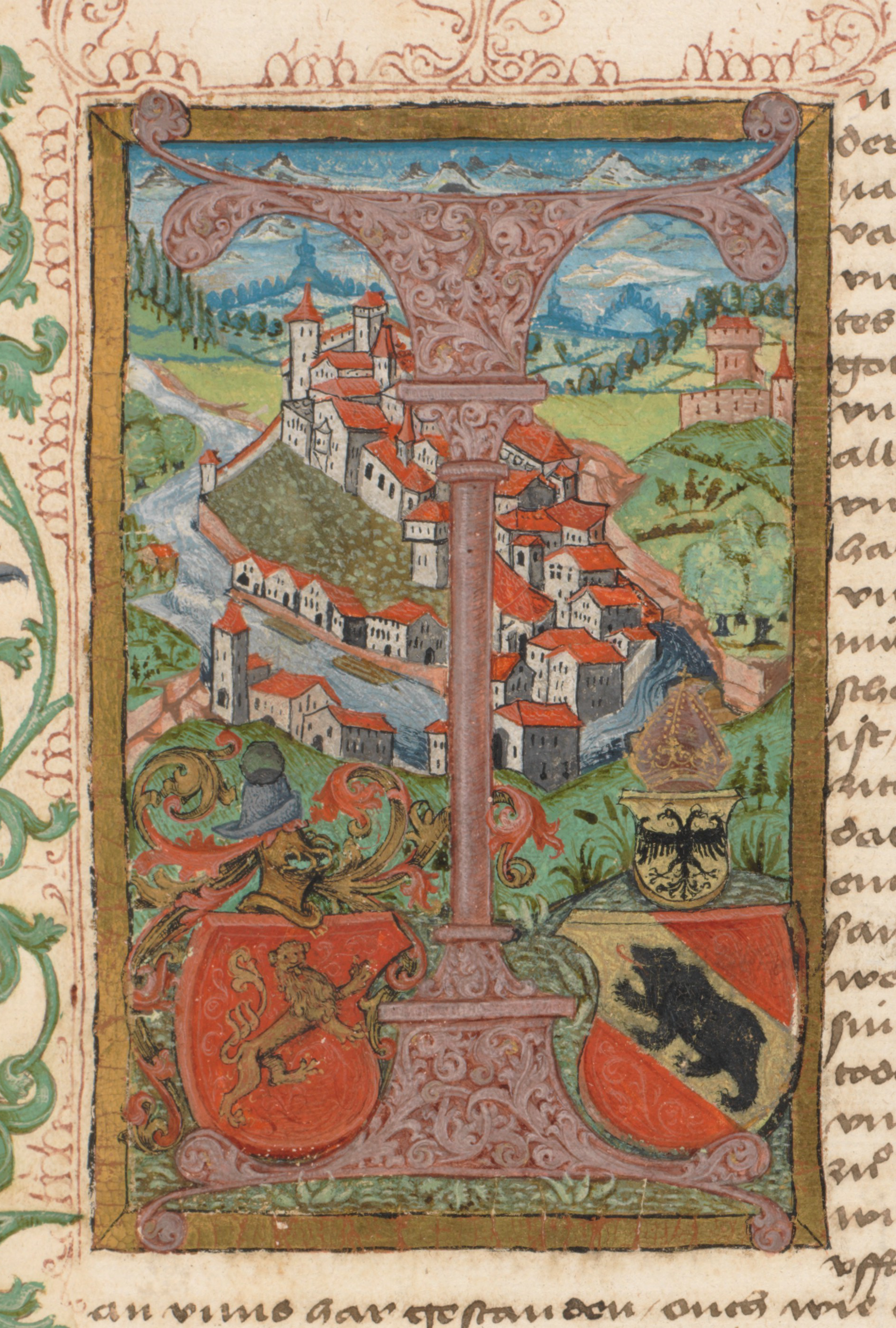
Bern, Spiezer Chronik, late 15th century; earliest extant image of Bern. Left: Zähringer Coat of Arms; right: Bernese Coat of Arms, surmounted by the Imperial Eagle signifying an Imperial Free City

The city of Bern is one of the Zähringer foundations of the late 12th century (traditional date 1191). By the end of the 13th century, it had acquired de facto imperial immediacy. It became a full member of the Old Swiss Confederacy in 1353, and during the 15th century managed to significantly expand its sphere of influence, notably with the conquest of Aargau in 1415. With the acquisition of Vaud in 1536, Bern became the most powerful city-republic north of the Alps, and one of the leading Protestant cities in early modern Switzerland. The canton of Bern in the Restored Confederacy of 1815 even after the loss of Aargau and Vaud remained the largest Swiss canton, relegated to second rank only with the secession of Jura in 1979. Since 1848 Bern has served as the federal city (capital) of Switzerland.

== Name ==
The etymology of the name Bern is uncertain. Local legend has it that Berchtold V, Duke of Zähringen, the founder of the City of Bern, vowed to name the city after the first animal he met on the hunt; as this turned out to be a bear, the city had both its name and its heraldic beast. However, the connection between Bern and Bär (bear) is a folk etymology. It has long been considered likely that the city was named after the Italian city of Verona, which at the time was known as Bern in Middle High German.

The Bern zinc tablet, which was found in the 1980s, indicates that the former oppidum's possible Celtic name Brenodor was still known in Roman times. Since that time, it has been supposed that Bern may be a corruption (folk-etymological re-interpretation) of the older, similar-sounding Celtic name. The etymology of the Celtic would be related to the Middle Irish word berna ‘gap, chasm’ (cf. Irish bearna, Scottish beàrn).

In the late medieval period, Bern was very strongly identified with its heraldic animal, which was used as an allegory of the military and feudal power of the canton within the Old Swiss Confederacy. The Bernese citizen-soldiers were depicted as armed bears, and from at least the 16th century also referred to as mötz, motzlin, a dialectal word for "bear". This term became Mutz in the modern language, and was in the 19th century applied to the city or canton (as a political or military power) itself. The city of Berne was also jestingly referred to as Mutzopolis.

== Early history ==
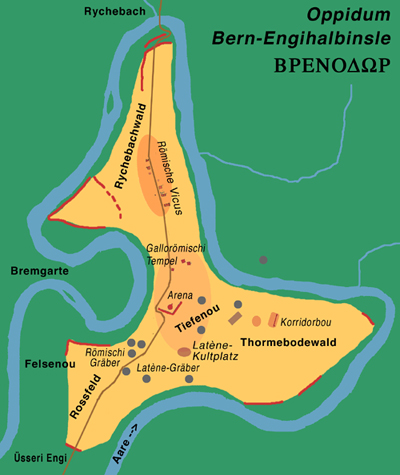
Map of the settlements at Engehalbinsel.

The earliest evidence of human settlements in the Aare valley dates back to the Neolithic period. However, the earliest known settlement in the area of the city of Bern was on the Engehalbinsel to the north of the later city. This late La Tène culture settlement was founded around 300 to 200 BCE and fortified in the 2nd century BCE. It is thought to have been one of the twelve oppida of the Helvetii mentioned by Caesar. In addition to the Engehalbinsel there were La Tène settlements in the Breitenrain, Kirchenfeld and Mattenhof districts as well as at Bümpliz, now a city district of Bern, some 4 km (2.5 mi) from the medieval city.

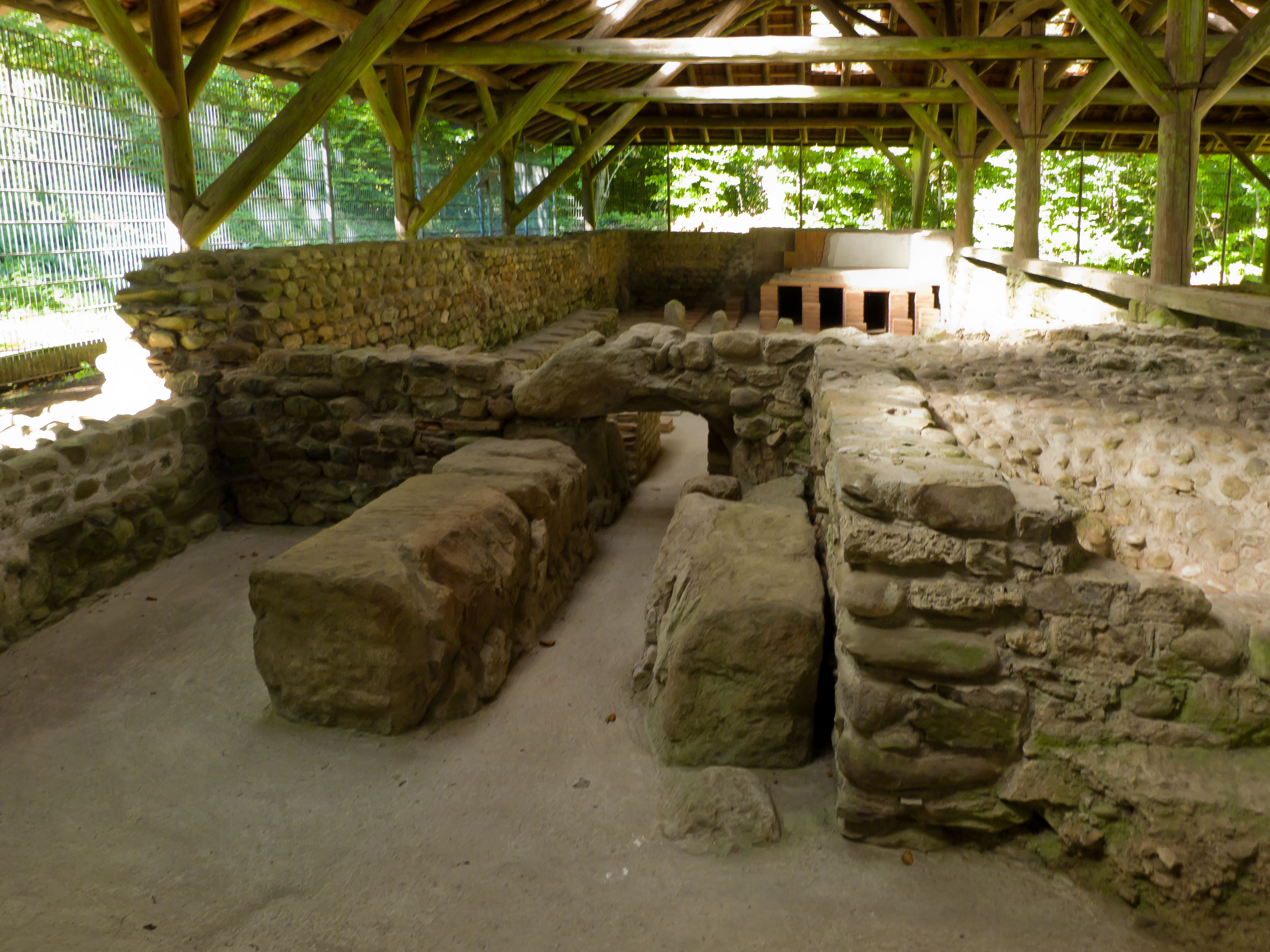
Roman baths at Engehalbinsel.

After the Roman conquest, a small Gallo-Roman settlement, a vicus, was re-founded at the same place. To the south of the vicus lay the burial ground with over 160 graves (some from the La Tène period). The vicus had a small amphitheater, a temple district with three small Gallo-Roman temples, several private buildings with attached workshops and at the northern end, a bathing facility. The main road led from the Vicus westward to Aventicum. The only other nearby Roman settlements were three farms, one near the Vicus, one in Haspelmatte and a widely spread farming complex in Bümpliz during the 2nd and 3rd century CE. The vicus at Engehalbinsel was abandoned between 165 and 211 CE.

Even after the fall of the Roman Empire, scattered settlements remained in the area around what is now Bern. A large graveyard, with over 300 graves, was in use during the 6th and 7th centuries on the southern edge of the Bremgarten woods. Other graveyards from the 7th century have been found in Weissenbühl and on the Rosenbühl hill. In the Early Middle Ages, there was a settlement with a church in Bümpliz' during the 7th to 10th centuries. In the 9th or 10th century a Burgundian Königshof (castle) with wooden fortifications was built near the settlement. However, no archaeological evidence indicating a settlement on the site of the old town of today's city prior to the 12th century have been found so far.

== Medieval foundation of Bern ==
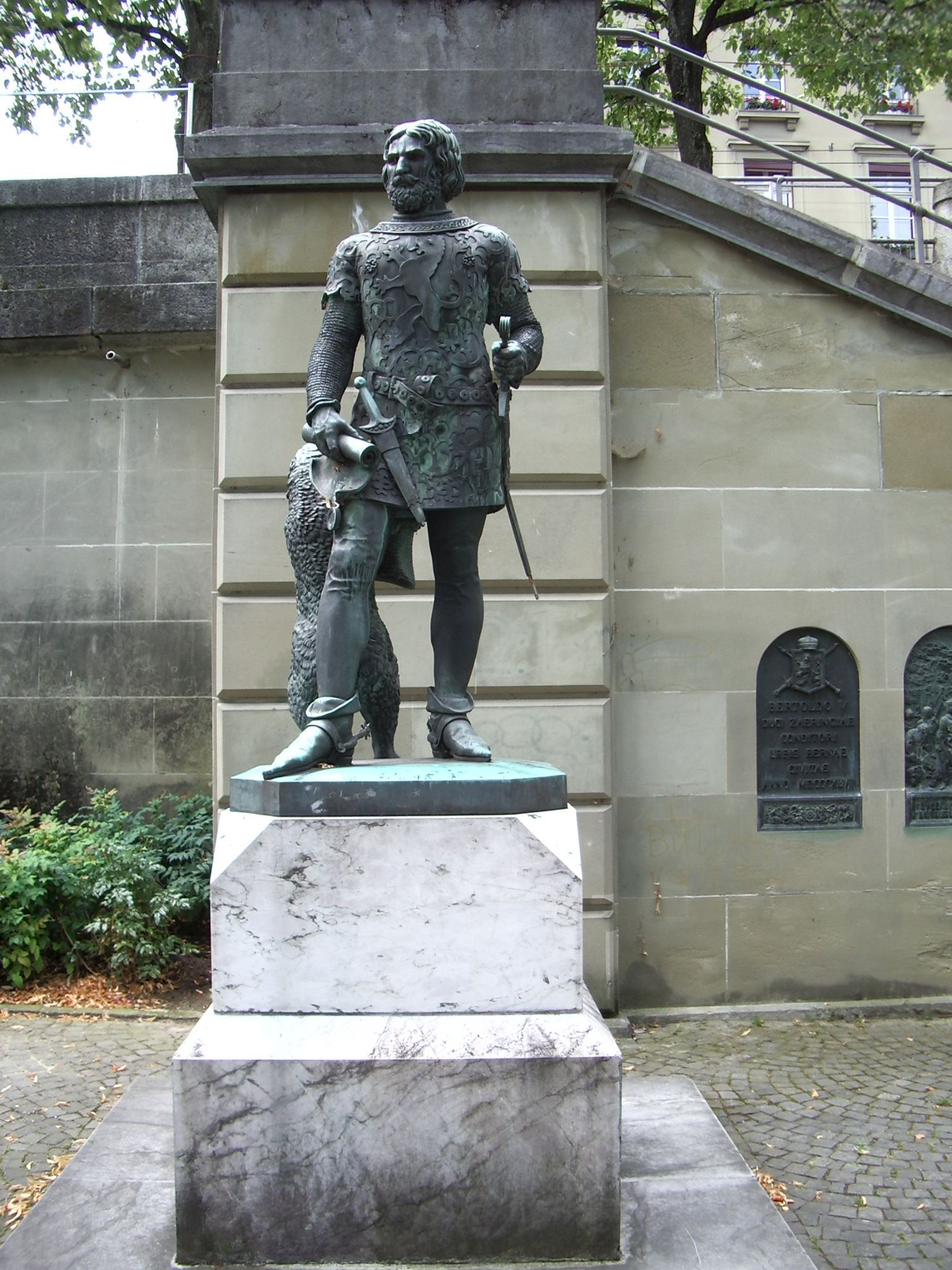
Statue of Berchtold V. Duke of Zähringen, 1847

The history of the city of Bern proper begins when Berthold V, Duke of Zähringen founded the city in the late 12th century - 1191 being the official date. At that time, much of today's western Switzerland (then considered part of southern Burgundy) was under the authority of the house of Zähringen. The Zähringer leaders, although with no actual duchy of their own, were styled dukes by decree of the German king and exercised imperial power south of the Rhine. To establish their position there, they founded or expanded numerous settlements, including Fribourg (in 1157), Bern, Burgdorf and Morat.

During the second half of the 12th century, Berchtold V of Zähringen built a small castle at Nydegg on the eastern part of the peninsula to guard the Aare. The castle stood on the border between the German-speaking Alamannians and the French-speaking Burgundians. Whether there was already a settlement there when the castle was built or if the town was first founded near the castle in 1191 by Berthold V and the extent of the first town are all debated. The original city was built westward along the narrow peninsula, with three main longitudinal streets running east to west. The layout and design of the city and the location of the church were all typical for Zähringen cities.

After the founder Berchtold V died heirless, Bern gained her town privileges and became an Imperial Free City in the Goldene Handfeste which is traditionally dated to 1218. The Goldene Handfeste purports to be from Emperor Frederick II, but is now believed by most scholars to be a Bernese forgery from the middle of the 13th century. However, on 16 January 1274, King Rudolph I of Germany confirmed the traditional rights laid out in the Goldene Handfeste. Initially the city was under a mayor, who came from one of the noble families that were citizens on Bern. At first he was appointed by the Zähringens, then by the Holy Roman Emperor or his representative, but by the late 13th century he was elected by the town council. By the late 13th century, Bern was a de facto independent city-state within the Holy Roman Empire.

== Old Swiss Confederacy ==
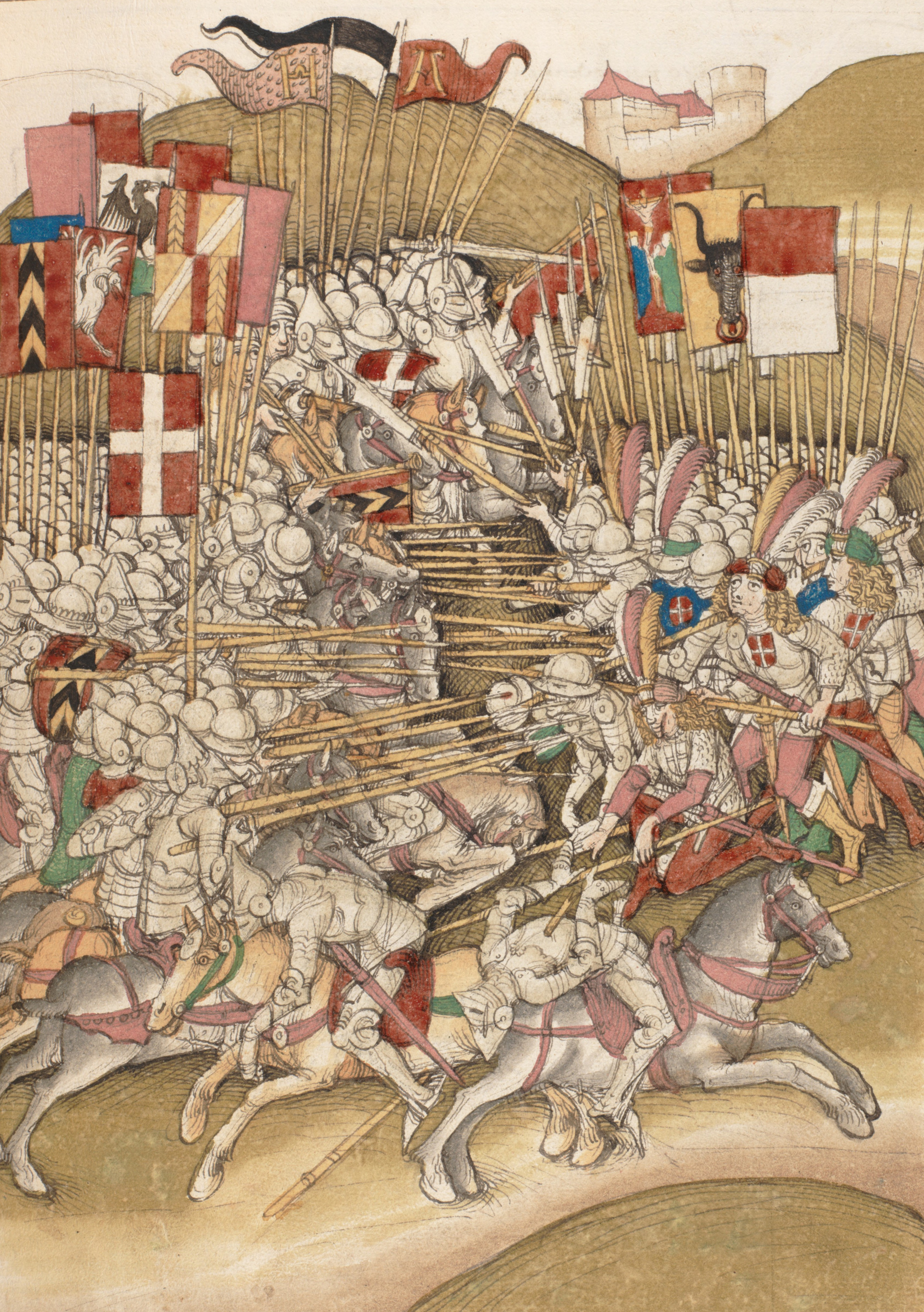
The Bernese victory at the Battle of Laupen helped bring Bern into the Swiss Confederation

In 1293, king Adolf of Germany confirmed all privileges which Berne had acquired during the interregnum of 1291–1293. While these privileges were still granted by a king and did not amount to imperial immediacy de jure, the city after 1300 acted confidently as an imperial city, pursuing a policy of sovereign territorial expansion.

In 1323 Bern entered an alliance with the Forest Cantons of Uri, Schwyz and Unterwalden. As Bern continued to expand during the early 14th century, they came into conflict with the Burgundian and Habsburg supported feudal lords and the neighboring city of Fribourg. In 1339 the feudal lords, in league with Fribourg, created a combined force of 17,000 men, including 1000 feudal heavy cavalry under the command of Rudolf von Nidau and Gérard de Valengin. While the cavalry were a powerful force, much of the infantry, with the exception of the Fribourg contingent, were poorly equipped and motivated. Bern requested support from their Swiss Confederation allies and was able to raise a force of 6,000 from Bern, Uri, Schwyz and Unterwalden, and other allies (Simmental, Weissenburg, Oberhasli). When the Fribourg forces laid siege to the Bernese border town of Laupen, the Bernese army marched out to raise the siege. While outnumbered two to one, the Bernese forces formed strong pike blocks that destroyed the Fribourg infantry and the heavy cavalry. The decisive Bernese victory allowed Bern to consolidate their power and brought them closer to the Forest Cantons.

In 1353 Bern upgraded its pact with the forest cantons to an eternal alliance, thus becoming a permanent member of the Old Swiss Confederacy. With Bern's accession, the confederacy had now reached the count of Acht Orte (Eight Cantons), concluding its formative period and entering its period of successful consolidation. Bern became a leading member of the Confederacy, significantly encouraging the expansionist policy it pursued during the later 14th and throughout the 15th century.

=== Growth of the city-state ===
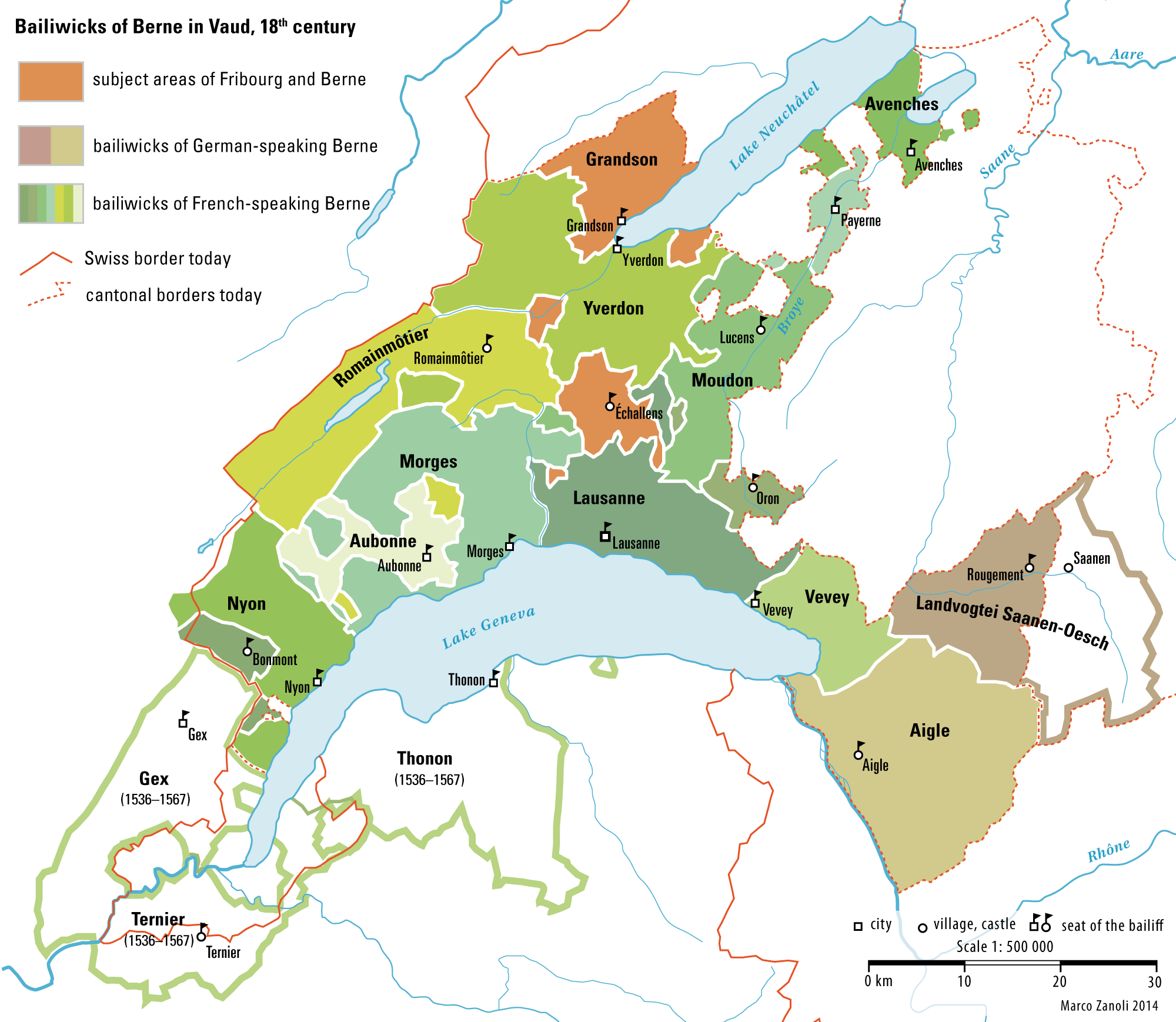
Bailiwicks of Bern in Vaud in the 18th century

Bern invaded and conquered Aargau in 1415 and Vaud in 1536, as well as other smaller territories, thereby becoming the largest city-state north of the Alps, by the 18th century comprising most of what is today the canton of Bern and the canton of Vaud.

The expansionist policy of the city of Bern led them into the Bernese Oberland. Through conquest, purchase, mortgage or marriage politics Bern was able to acquire the majority of the Oberland from the indebted local barons between 1323 and 1400. Under Bernese control, the five valleys enjoyed extensive rights and far-reaching autonomy in the Bäuerten (farming cooperative municipalities) and Talverbänden (rural alpine communities). Throughout the Late Middle Ages, the Oberland, as a whole or in part, revolted several times against Bernese authority. The Evil League (Böser Bund) in 1445 fought against Bernese military service and taxes following the Old Zürich War, in 1528 the Oberland rose up in resistance to the Protestant Reformation and in 1641 Thun revolted.

=== Development of the city ===
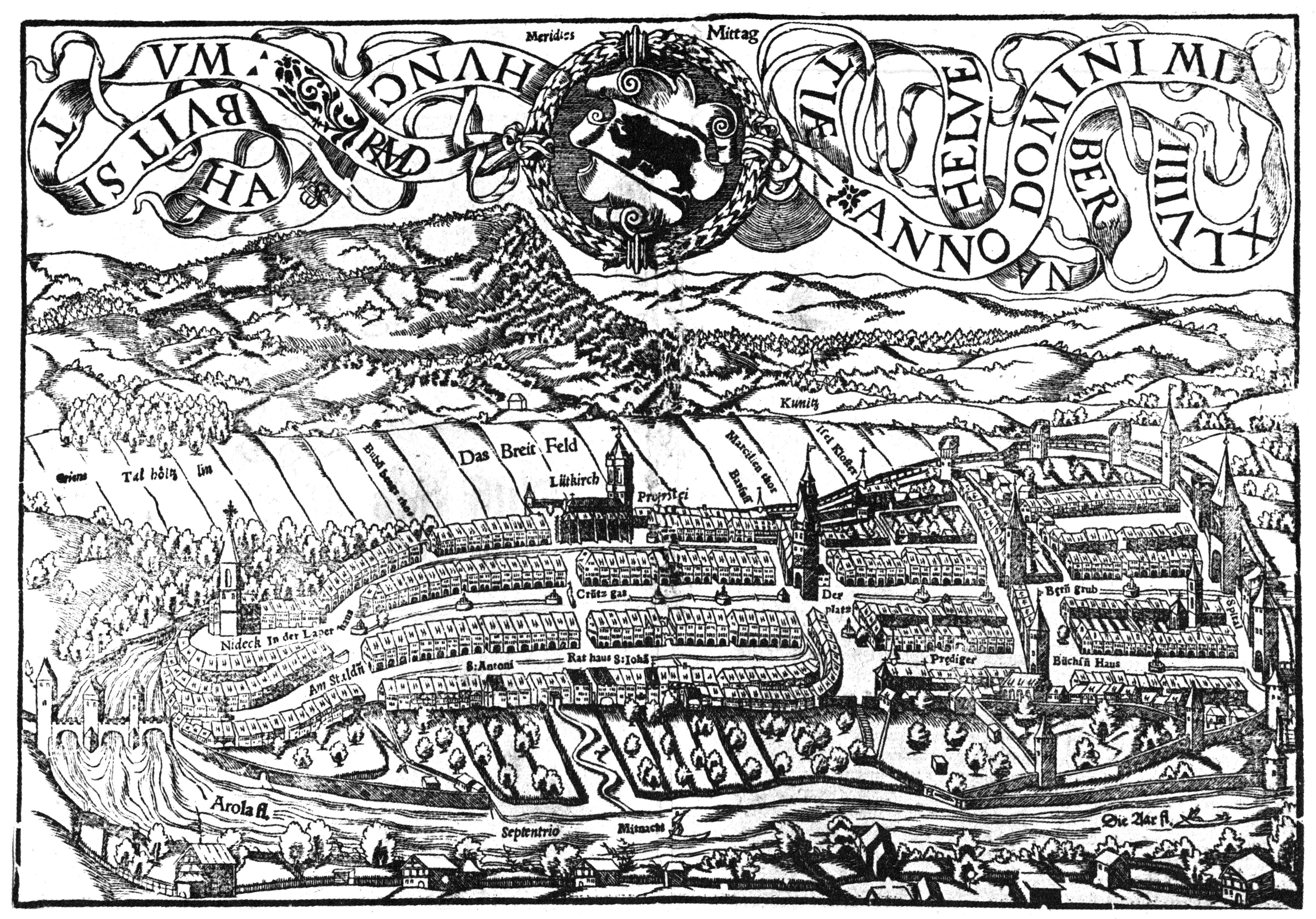
Bern in 1549

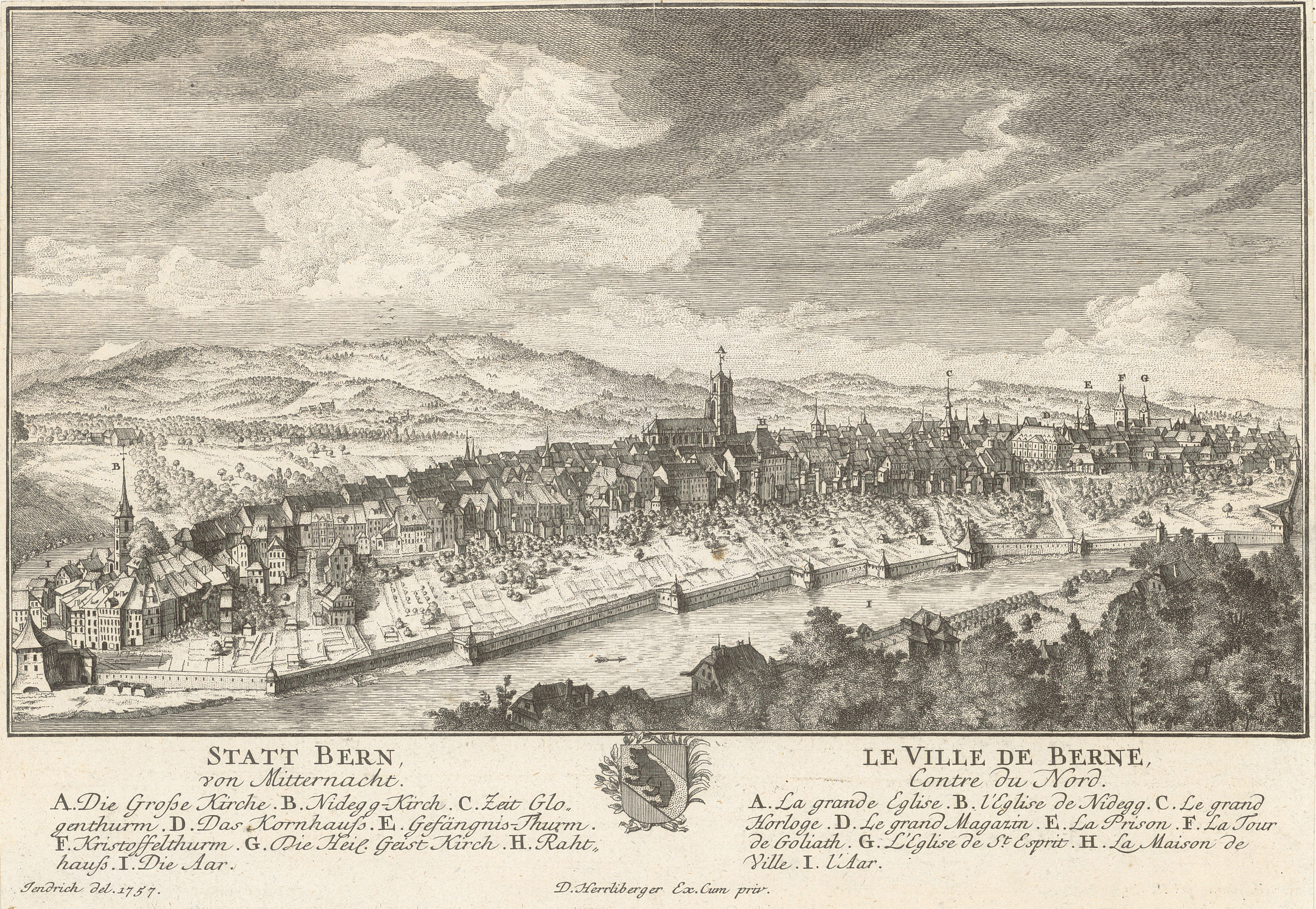
Bern in 1757

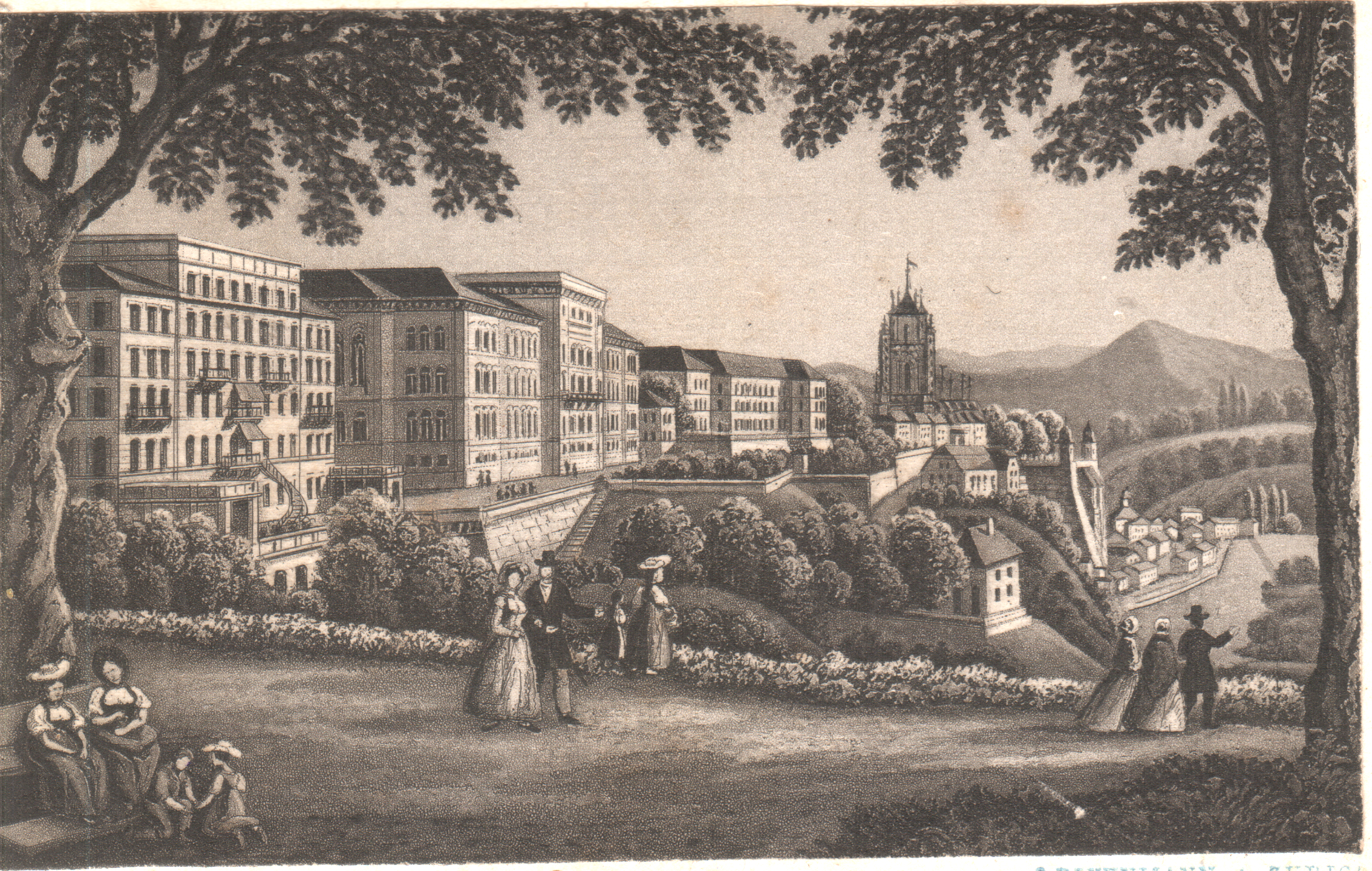
Bern

At its founding, the city is estimated to have had some 400 to 600 inhabitants, which grew to 3,000 by about 1300. During the city's rapid growth in the 13th century, the older castle of Nydegg around which the early settlement was built, was demolished, the Aare slopes fortified and the layout of today's Old Town established. The strong Neustadt fortifications, which closed off the peninsula, formed the limit for the city's growth up until the 19th century.

The city grew out towards the west of the boundaries of the peninsula formed by the river Aare. Initially, the Zytglogge tower marked the western boundary of the city from 1191 until 1256, when the Käfigturm took over this role until 1345, which, in turn, was then succeeded by the Christoffelturm (located close to today's train station) until 1622. During the time of the Thirty Years' War two new fortifications, the so-called big and small Schanze (entrenchment), were built to protect the whole area of the peninsula.

After a major blaze in 1405, the original wooden buildings were gradually replaced by half-timbered houses and later the sandstone buildings that came to be characteristic for the Old Town. Despite the waves of pestilence that hit Europe in the 14th century, the city continued to grow mainly due to immigration from the surrounding countryside.

As Bern was not situated at any of the major trading routes, agriculture quickly became of principal economic importance and remained so throughout Bernese history. Tannery also became an important industry, and leather goods one of Bern's main exports. In the 14th century, as the importance of European commerce began to rise, numerous wealthy trading families emerged as the city's aristocracy. They mainly turned to government and mercenary service in the 15th century, though, and trade stagnated as the city's autocratic rule over the countryside strengthened. Bernese commerce and crafts, organised in guilds, bloomed in the 16th and 17th centuries, with Bernese glass paintings being especially in demand across Europe.

=== Society and politics ===
The traditional constitution of Bern, established in 1294, remained largely unchanged until 1798. It provided for a Grosser Rat (Grand Council) of two hundred members and a Kleiner Rat (Small Council) of 27 members. The latter included the Schultheiss (mayor) as chief executive and the holders of other public offices such as guild representatives, Stadtschreiber (city clerk), Seckelmeister (bursar) and Grossweibel (Grand Bailiff).

In the Middle Ages, upwards mobility and access to public offices was relatively easy for successful traders and craftsmen, but Bernese society became ever more stratified and aristocratic as the power and wealth of the city grew. By the 17th century, citizenship had become an inherited prerogative, all political bodies elected one another and officials were elected for life. Bern now styled itself as a Republic (Stadt und Republik Bern, Republica Bernensis) rather than a Reichsstadt, following the example of the Italian city republics. In effect, public offices were now the exclusive prerogative of the gnädige Herren, the "merciful lords", as the small number of noble families now ruling Bern came to be called. In 1605 there were 152 families that were qualified to rule, by 1691 that number was only 104, while towards the end of the 18th century there were only 69 such families. Meanwhile, the land ruled by the town was extending over more and more territory, so that finally it governed 52 bailiwicks. These offices became very lucrative as the Bernese territories grew. Patrician Landvögte, sheriffs, ruled the politically powerless countryside, often using armed force to put down peasant revolts. From 1689 to 3 March 1798 in the town was printed, in French, the biweekly newspaper Gazette de Berne, which reflected the opinions of Bern, usually hostile to the politics of Pre-revolutionary France.

In 1528, after debates which took three weeks (January 6 to 26, known as the Bern Disputation) Bern has converted to Protestantism.

== Modern history ==
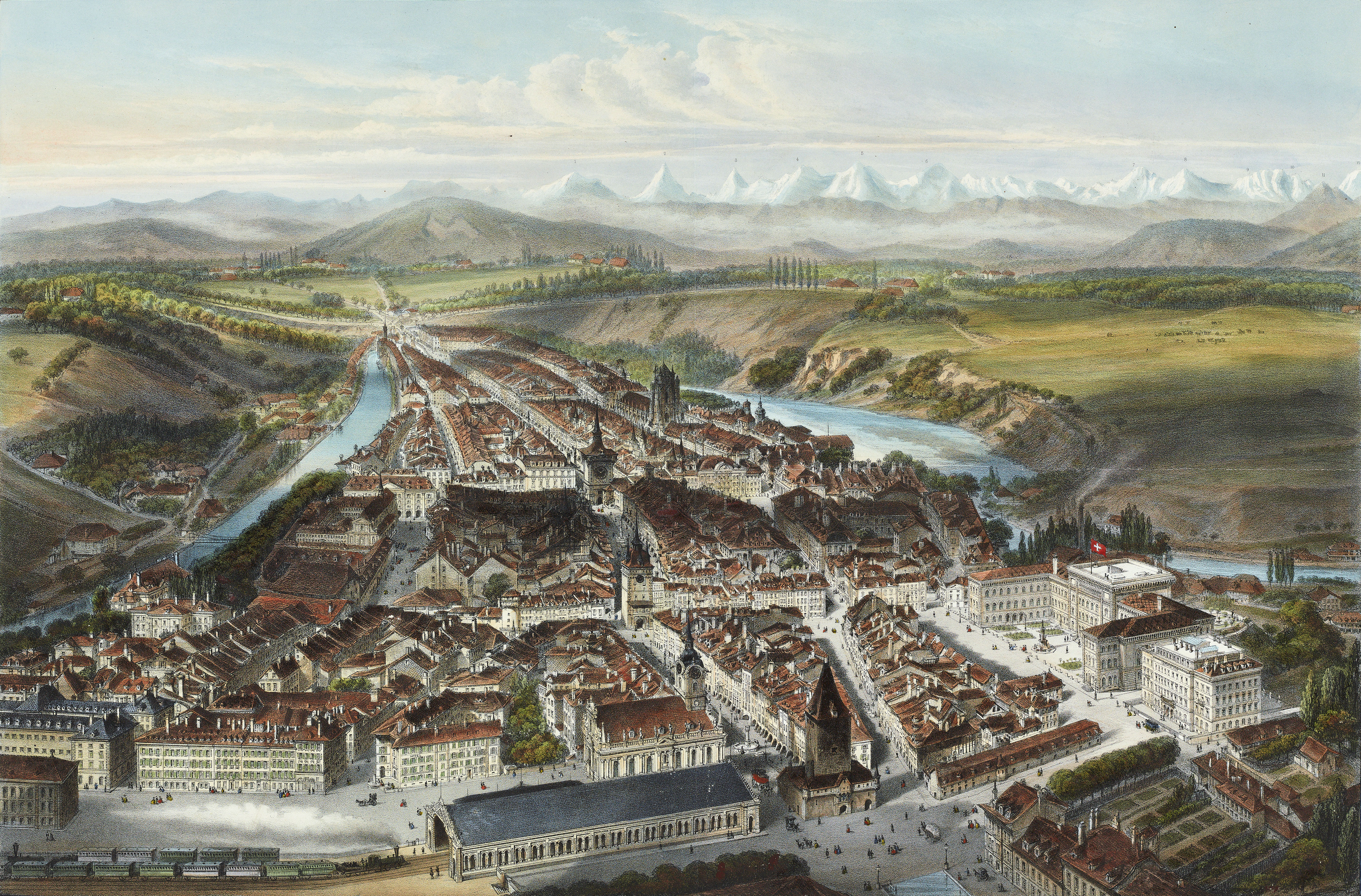
Bern in 1858

Bern was occupied by French troops in 1798 during the French Revolutionary Wars, when it was stripped of parts of its territories. The Bernese Oberland was stripped away to become the Canton of Oberland. Within the new canton, historic borders and traditional rights were not considered. As there had been no previous separatist feeling amongst the conservative population, there was little enthusiasm for the new order. The 1801 Malmaison Constitution proposed reuniting the Oberland with Bern, but it was not until the Act of Mediation, two years later, with the abolition of the Helvetic Republic and the partial restoration of the ancien régime, that the two cantons were reunited.

Following the Congress of Vienna of 1814 newly acquired the Bernese Jura, once again becoming the largest canton of the confederacy as it stood during the Restoration, and further until the secession of the canton of Jura in 1979. In 1848 Bern was made the Federal City (seat of the Federal Assembly) of the new Swiss federal state.

A number of congresses of the socialist First and Second Internationals were held in Bern, particularly during World War I when Switzerland was neutral; see Bern International.

The city's population rose from about 5,000 in the 15th century to about 12,000 by 1800 and to above 60,000 by 1900, passing the 100,000 mark during the 1920s. Population peaked during the 1960s at 165,000, and has since decreased slightly, to below 130,000 by 2000. As of 31 December 2009, resident population was at 130,289 of which 101,627 were Swiss citizens and 28,662 (22%) resident foreigners. Another estimated 350,000 people live in the immediate urban agglomeration.

== See also ==
- Timeline of Bern
- Swiss peasant war of 1653
- History of the Jews in Bern
