= Golden Charter of Bern =

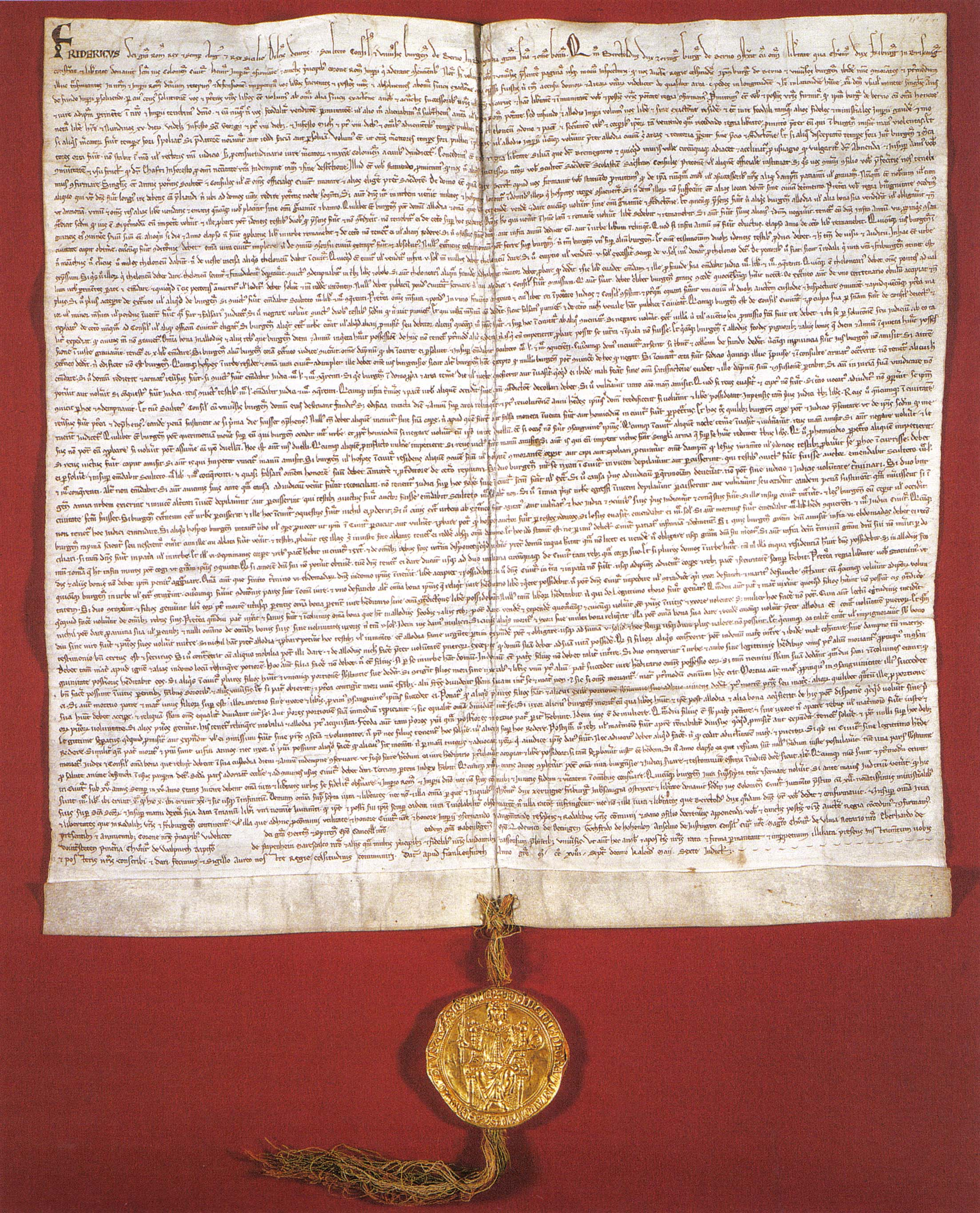
The Golden Charter of Bern.

The Golden Charter of Bern (also: Golden Bull, in German: Goldene Handfeste or Berner Handfeste) is a medieval charter purporting to have been issued by Holy Roman Emperor Frederick II. It establishes the town privileges of Bern (now the capital of Switzerland), making it an Imperial Free City and, effectively, an independent state. The charter is dated to 1218, but is now believed by most scholars to be a Bernese forgery from the middle of the 13th century.

The charter's 54 articles provided for extensive privileges, including the free election of the Schultheiss (i.e., mayor) and the right to autonomously legislate. It also provided for the establishment of an Imperial Mint, which was established in 1228 at the latest, to coin Berner Pfennige. These rights were formally confirmed by King Rudolf I in 1274, and the issue of the charter's authenticity thus made moot. The charter is called "golden" due to its impressive (and undoubtedly authentic) golden bull, or seal. Its face shows Frederick on the throne with his Emperor's regalia, circumscribed "Frederick, by the Grace of God Roman King, ever increasing the Empire, King of Sicily."

The issue of whether the charter — regarded as Bern's founding document for centuries — is authentic has been contentious among historians since the 1860s. Modern researchers now seem to agree that it is a forgery done on behalf of Bern's government during the middle of the 13th century, done to establish in writing the rights the city had in practice seized decades previously. They point out that the exceptional liberties granted by the charter were very atypical for the time, and that the writing seems to match that of one writer in the Frienisberg monastery. Monasteries, at that time, were masters of the pia fraus, the "pious fraud" of falsifying documents to match a dead benefactor's supposed intent. On the other hand, X-ray analysis in 2002 did not reveal any indication that (as had been assumed) the authentic bull had been removed from an authentic document and then re-affixed to the Bernese charter.

== See also ==
- History of Bern
