= Bern banking crisis of 1720 =

Swiss speculative market failure

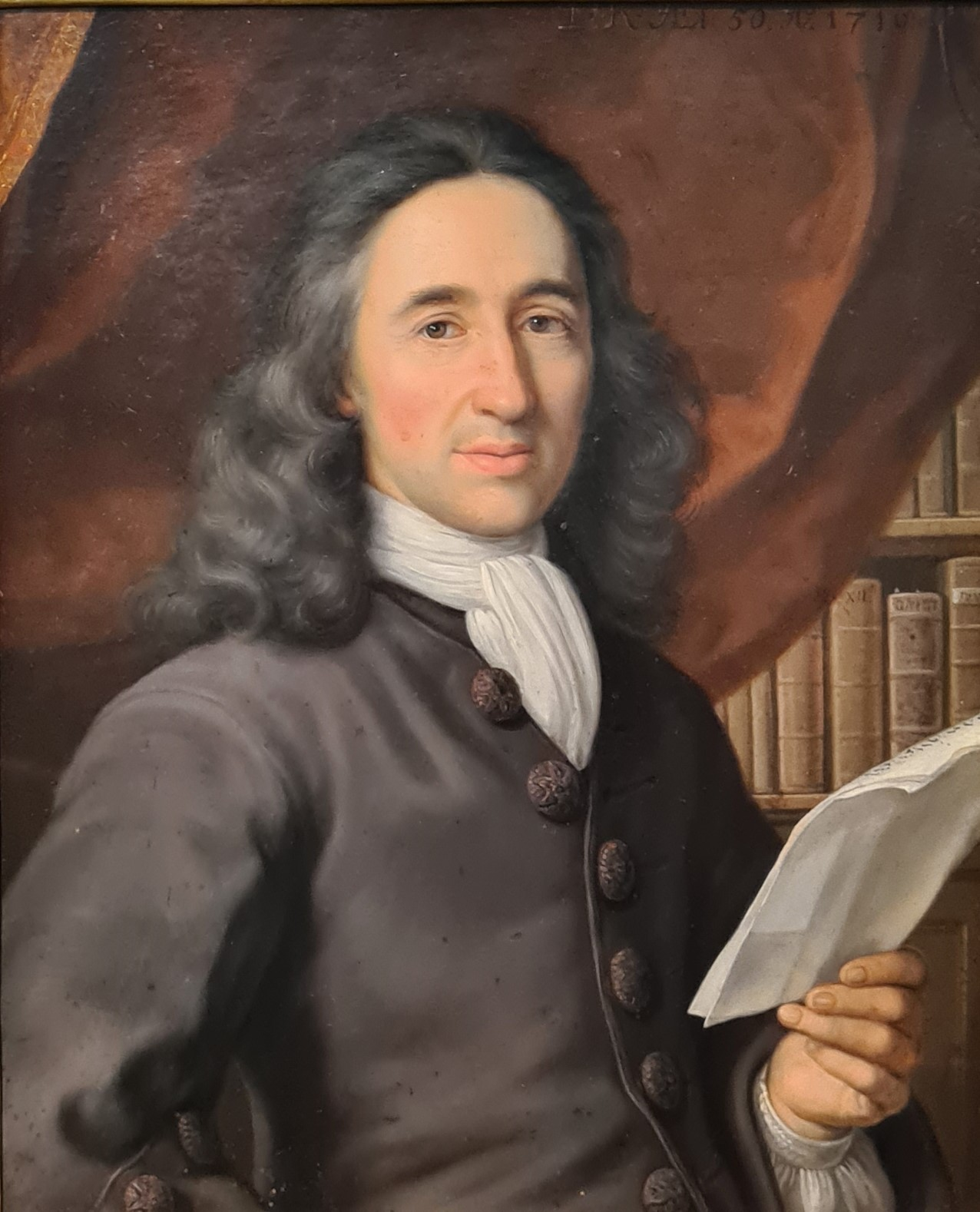
Daniel Knopf, agent of the bank Malacrida & Cie. (1716)

The Republic of Bern invested its money as early as the 17th century, and also abroad in the 18th century. A speculative bubble with securities on the stock exchanges of Paris (Mississippi bubble) and London (South Sea bubble) had far-reaching international consequences around 1720. The Bernese banking houses responsible for investing state funds collapsed. Together with the Tulip Crisis of 1637, these are two early speculative crises in modern Europe.

In the early modern period, some of the Swiss Confederated States had financial surpluses. In the second half of the 17th century, Berne began to manage its surpluses professionally. From 1710, the banking house Malacrida & Cie. was commissioned to invest funds abroad together with the bank Samuel Müller & Cie. in London. The partners of Bank Malacrida & Cie. were Niklaus Malacrida (1658-1742), Gabriel Frisching (1666-1741), his uncle Sigmund Weiss (1666-1724), Friedrich von Wattenwyl (1665-1741) and his brother-in-law Emanuel Steiger (1663-1743). Due to the national debt, France gradually began to replace the precious metal currency with paper money, London adopted the idea and, as a result, an unimaginable stock market boom arose. The Bernese representatives speculated and initially made huge profits. In mid-July 1720, the bubble burst (called the South Sea Bubble because of the company involved) and the securities lost their value. Between November 1720 and June 1721, the two Bernese institutions became insolvent and had to be liquidated. In addition to the state, Bernese village communities, the guilds in the city, family chests and members of all social classes also lost money, in some cases considerable amounts. The total loss amounted to 440,000 thalers, distributed among around 500 creditors. The Mayor Christoph Steiger (I.), uncle of bank partner Emanuel Steiger, suffered a high loss of 4,498 crowns. A crisis had broken out in Bern as a result of the bankruptcy of the two banks. In the absence of cross-border bankruptcy proceedings, the liquidation dragged on for around eleven years.

== Sources ==
- Nikolaus Linder: Die Berner Bankenkrise von 1720 und das Recht. Eine Studie zur Rechts-, Banken- und Finanzgeschichte der Alten Schweiz. Zürich: Schulthess Juristische Medien, 2004.
- Wolfgang Friedrich von Mülinen: Law und Malacrida. In: Neues Berner Taschenbuch auf das Jahr 1897, p. 137–162. doi:10.5169/seals-126801
