= Bern Town Hall =

- Rathaus Bern
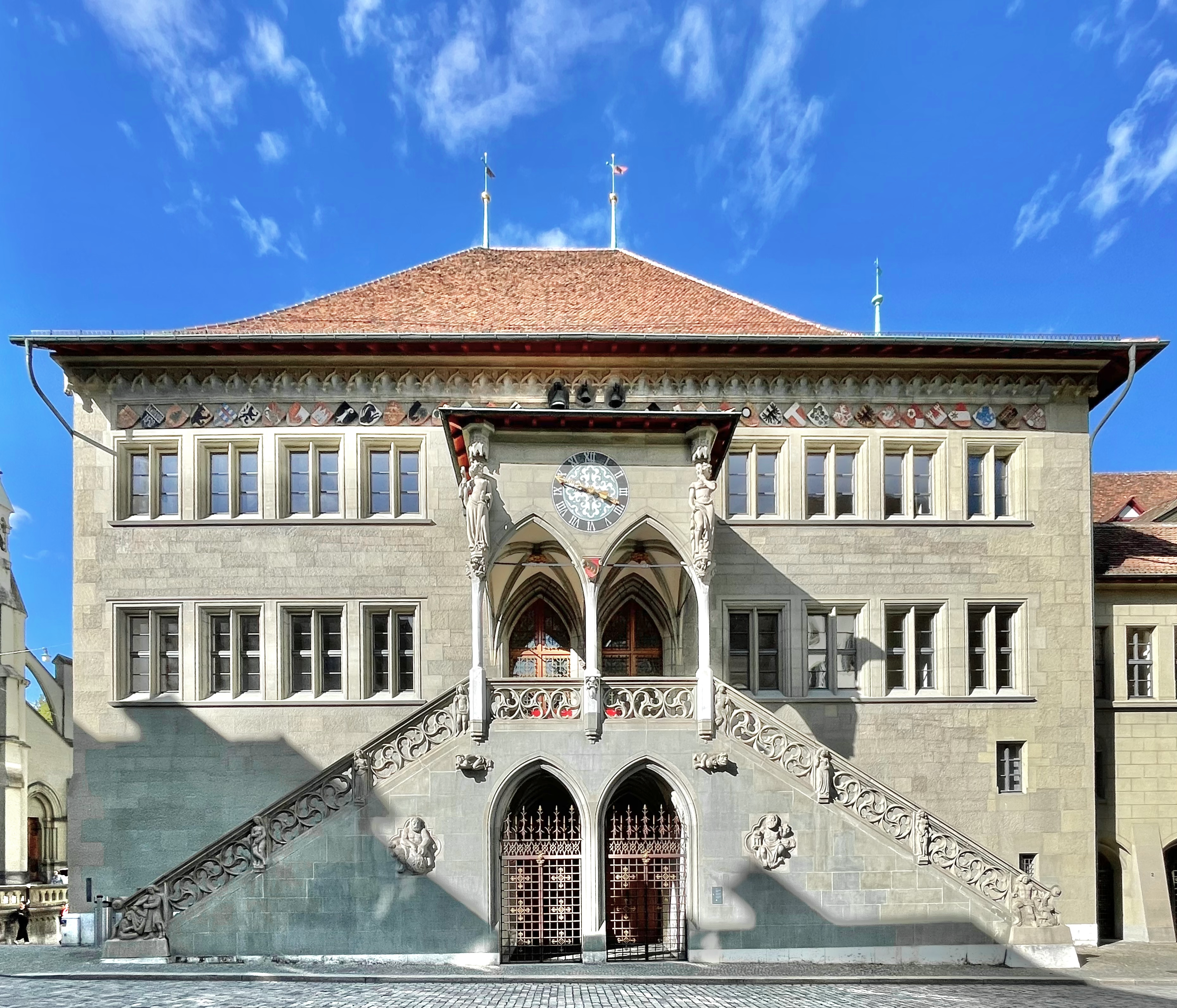
- Town hall at Rathausplatz 2

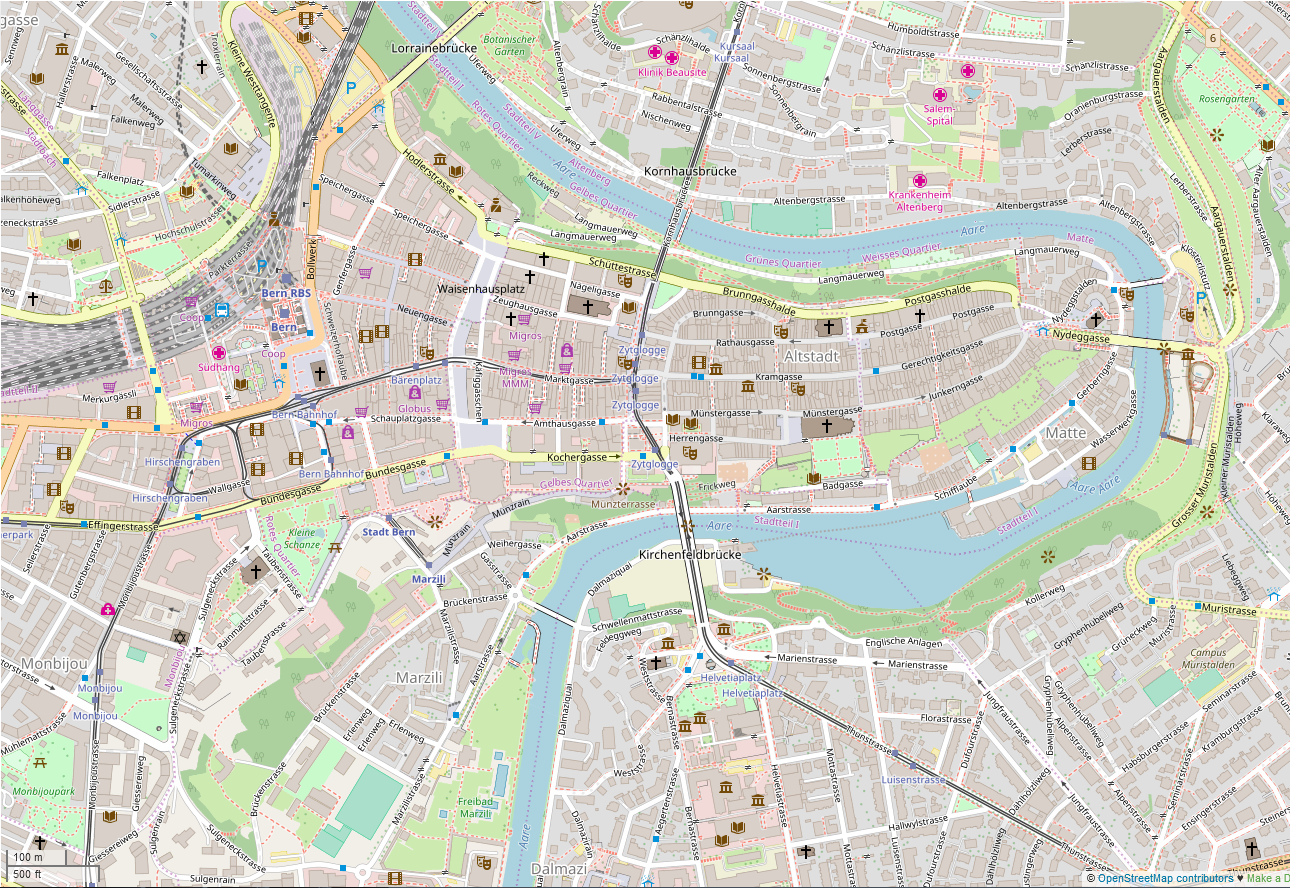
- Location within Bern Bern Town Hall (Canton of Bern) Bern Town Hall (Switzerland)

General information
- Status: Completed
- Type: Government
- Architectural style: Late-gothic
- Location: Rathausplatz 2, Bern, Switzerland
- Coordinates: 46°56′55.5″N 7°27′08.6″E
- Construction started: 1406/07

Website
- www.rathaus.sites.be.ch

Swiss Cultural Property of National Significance

The Bern Town Hall (German: Rathaus Bern) is the building in Bern, Switzerland that houses the Grand Council of Bern (German: Grosser Rat, French: Grand conseil), the Executive Council of Bern (German: Regierungsrat, French: Conseil-éxecutif) and the Grand Council of the City of Bern. The building is part of the UNESCO World Heritage Site of the Old City of Berne and is a Swiss heritage site of national significance.

The Grand Council of the Canton of Bern meets in the town hall five times per year for about two weeks per session.

== History ==
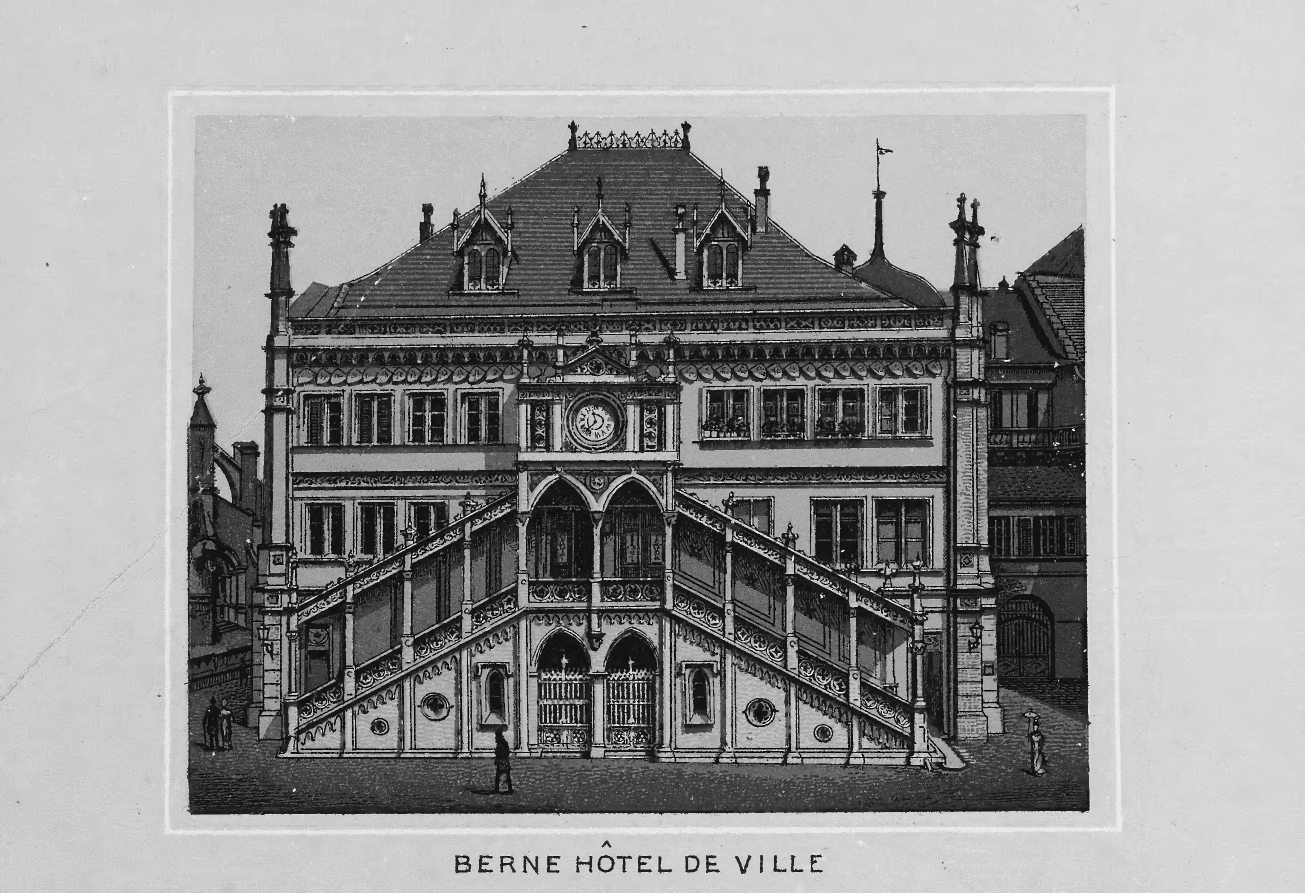
1890 appearance of the town hall, before the 1940–42 renovation.

The first town hall of the city of Bern was built at Nydeggstalden. Known as the Burger Hus and the domus dicta die helle it was probably replaced by the new town hall around 1355. Between 1402 and its destruction in the great fire of 1405 it was privately owned. The second town hall was built on Junkerngasse near the choir of the Bern Minster. City and cantonal governments moved out in 1414 and it was used as a school until 1468, when it was demolished to expand the Bern Minster. Following a fire in 1405 which destroyed much of the city, including the first town hall, plans were developed for a new, larger one in the area cleared by the fire. This new town hall was intended to match the growing power of the city and be large and impressive enough to receive foreign visitors.

The building was begun in 1406–07 by Heinrich von Gengenbach on the site of a townhouse owned by the Burgistein family. Von Gengenbach died shortly after construction began. It was completed around 1415 to 1417. Between 1430 and 1450 the grand external staircase was built and two chambers for the great and small councils were added to the upper story. Between 1526 and 1540 the canton council building was added near the hall. Beginning in the 16th century other government entities moved into the building including the canton archives, the treasury, the mint and the canton printing office.

A staircase tower and gallery wing were added on the east side in 1664–66 by Abraham and David Edelstein. A plan in 1788 to replace the medieval building by a grand new building designed by the Parisian architect Jacques-Denis Antoine was cancelled due to cost. Instead the building was partially renovated several times during the 18th and 19th centuries. The building was totally renovated in 1865–68 by Friedrich Salvisberg, repairing and modernizing it. The entire facade was redone in the Neo Gothic style, with a much more ornate grand staircase. In 1940–42 the building was totally renovated again under Martin Risch. The archives were moved to their current home on Falkenplatz. Many of the Neo Gothic elements were removed and the exterior of the building was returned to its earlier appearance. The large hall in the ground floor was restored to the original design. The council rooms in the upper floor were rebuilt in a modern style.

== Exterior ==
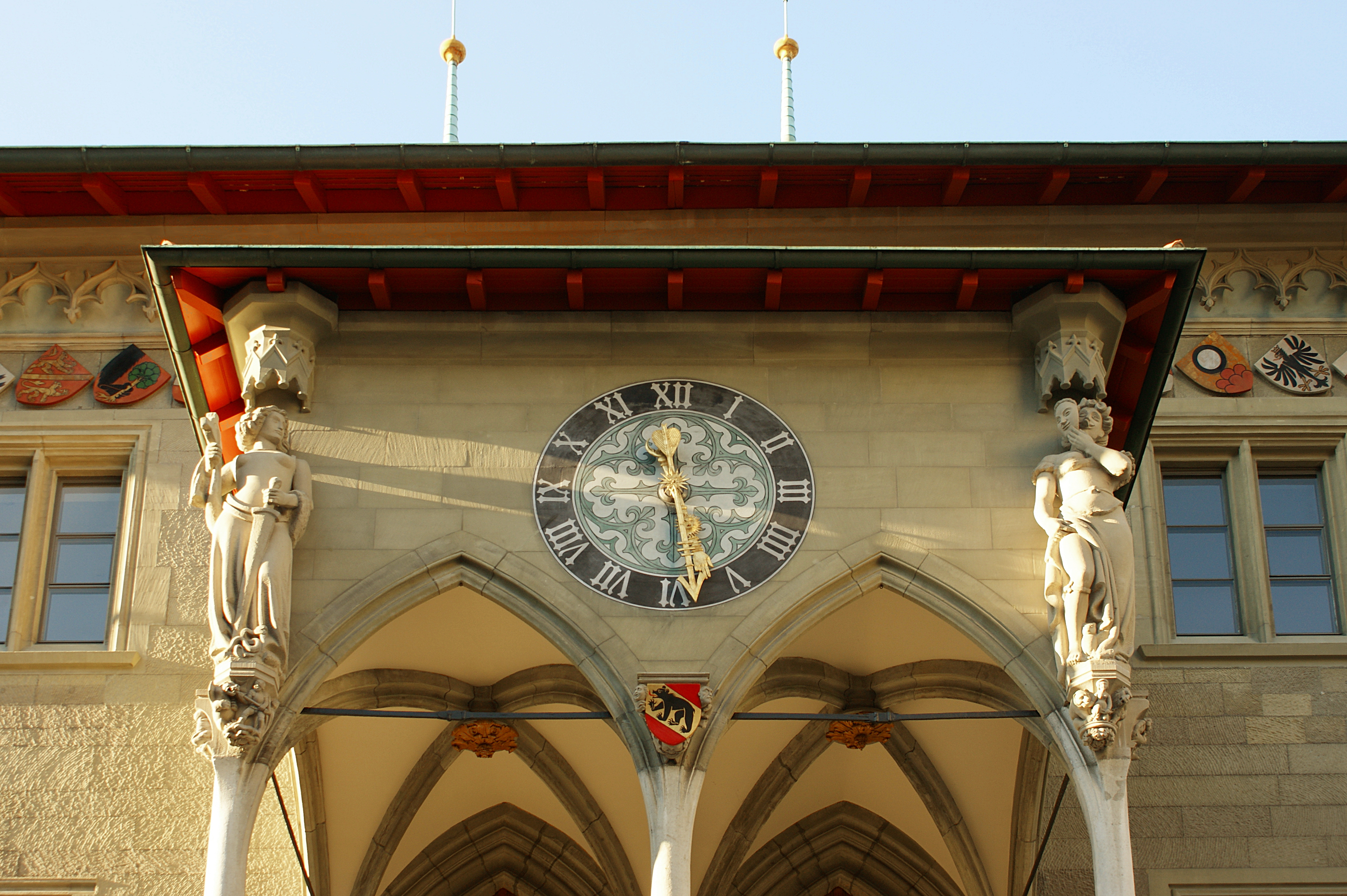
Detail of the staircase loggia.

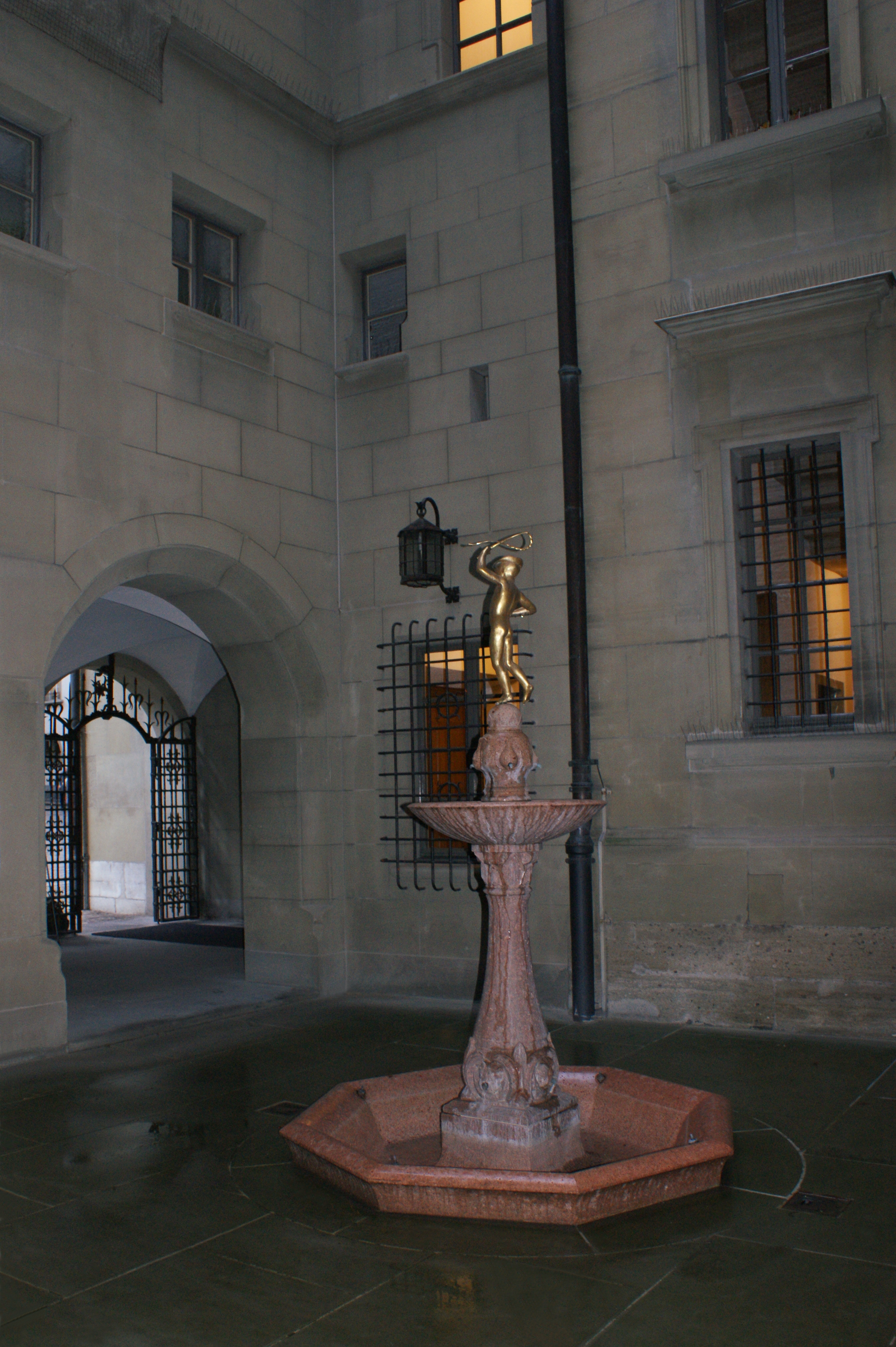
Hermes fountain in the courtyard

The main building is a square, three story sandstone structure. The south facade is symmetric around the large open air staircase and main entrance loggia into the upper story. The upper story has four sets of windows on each side of the main entrance. The 20th century renovation removed much of the roof over the staircase, leaving only the center section with its double pointed arch vault which was restored to its medieval appearance. The statues which adorn the clock pavilion are copies of the original polychrome statues by Master Hariman of Prague. The shield with the Bern coat of arms was originally an imperial eagle. The iron gates in the portals below the stairs are original treasure chamber doors by Michel Müller. Flanking the main entrance under the roof are the 26 shields of the 26 former districts (German: Amtsbezirke, French: districts) of the canton. These districts lost their administrative and political significance in 2010.

The unadorned west facade also comes from the 1940–42 renovation. A line visible on the west facade has traditionally been believed to have come from an earlier fortification.

The 1940–42 renovation of the north facade demolished most of the later additions to the building. The only element retained was nine large, cross-windows of which eight were from the original 1417/50 construction. The 20th century renovation added an additional nine cross-windows above the earlier windows. The slender north-east tower, a symbol of the city since the 15th century, the Baroque oriel windows and the octagonal bell tower were all removed.

The east side of the building has a square, Louis XIII style staircase tower. East of the old town hall building is the Staatskanzlei or cantonal administration building. The wing connecting the Staatskanzlei building and the town hall was built in 1664–66 by David and Abraham Edelstein. During the 1940–42 renovation a hall was added on the Postgasse side connecting the Rathaus and the Staatskanzlei. In the courtyard between the two buildings is a fountain topped with a sculpture of Hermes made in 1953 by Max Fueter.

== Interior ==
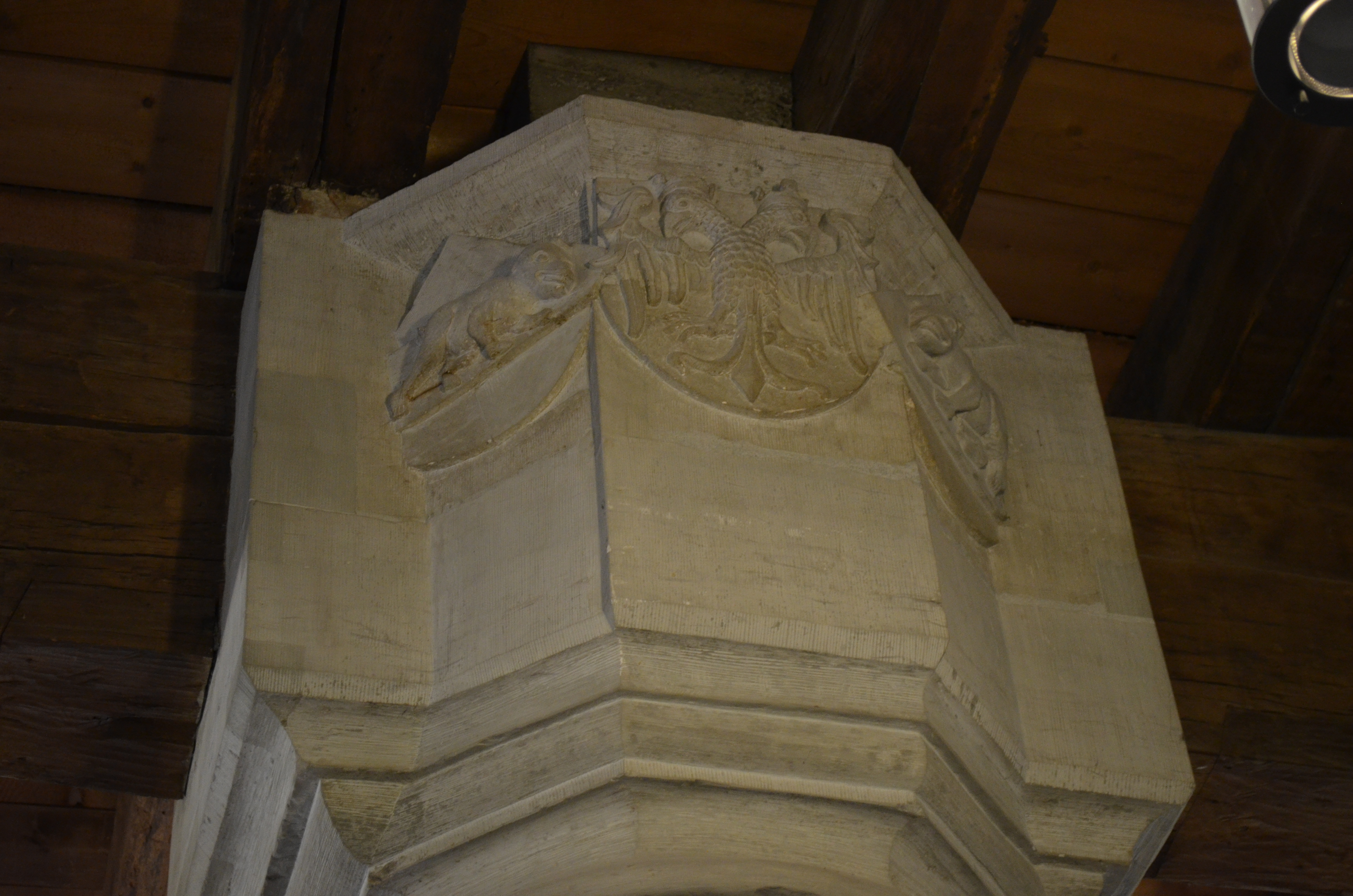
Carved column capital from the ground floor great hall.

The ground floor of the town hall is a single, large room, measuring about 22 m × 22 m (72 ft × 72 ft) and 5.5 m (18 ft) high. Originally built as a market hall and a court room the hall was a center of Bernese city life. The 1940–42 renovation returned it to the original medieval appearance. The room is dominated by 9 free standing columns (three rows of three) and six columns attached to the walls. Each column is built from seven sandstone cylinders, each about 78–80 cm (31–31 in) in diameter. The columns are topped with large sandstone capitals which in turn support a total of 29 oak beams forming the foundation of the council chambers above.

== Gallery ==
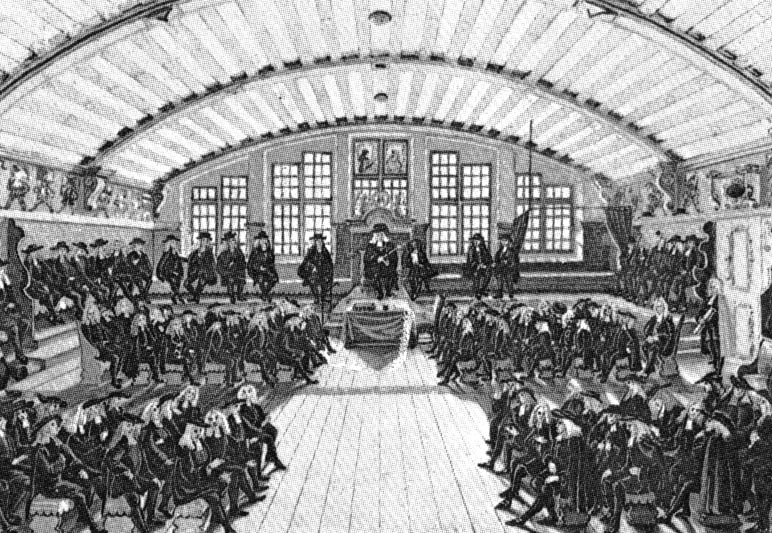
The great council in 1735

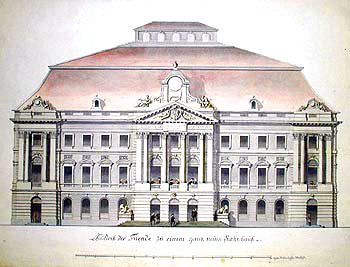
Proposed replacement building design in 1788

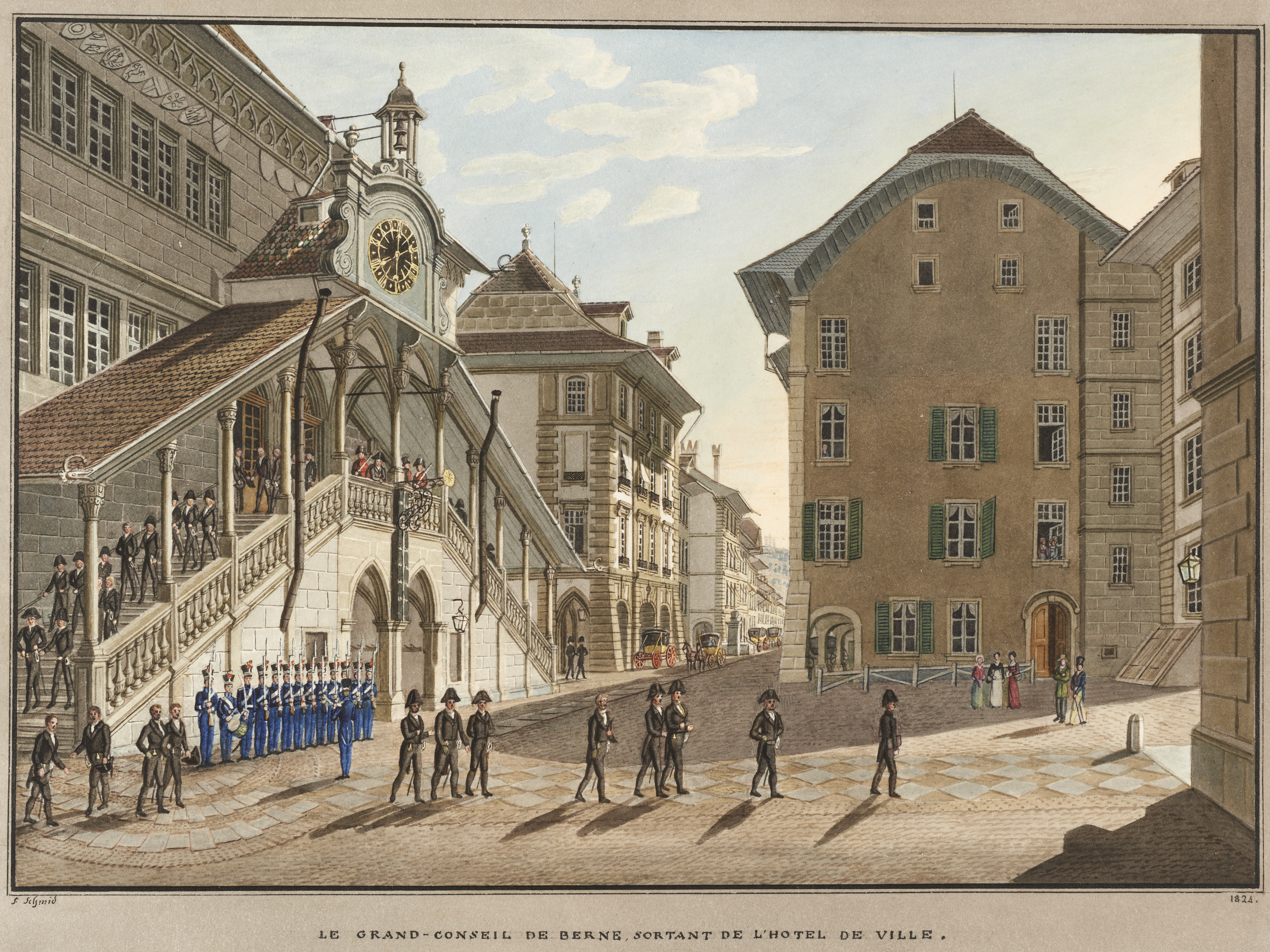
The Neo Gothic facade in 1824

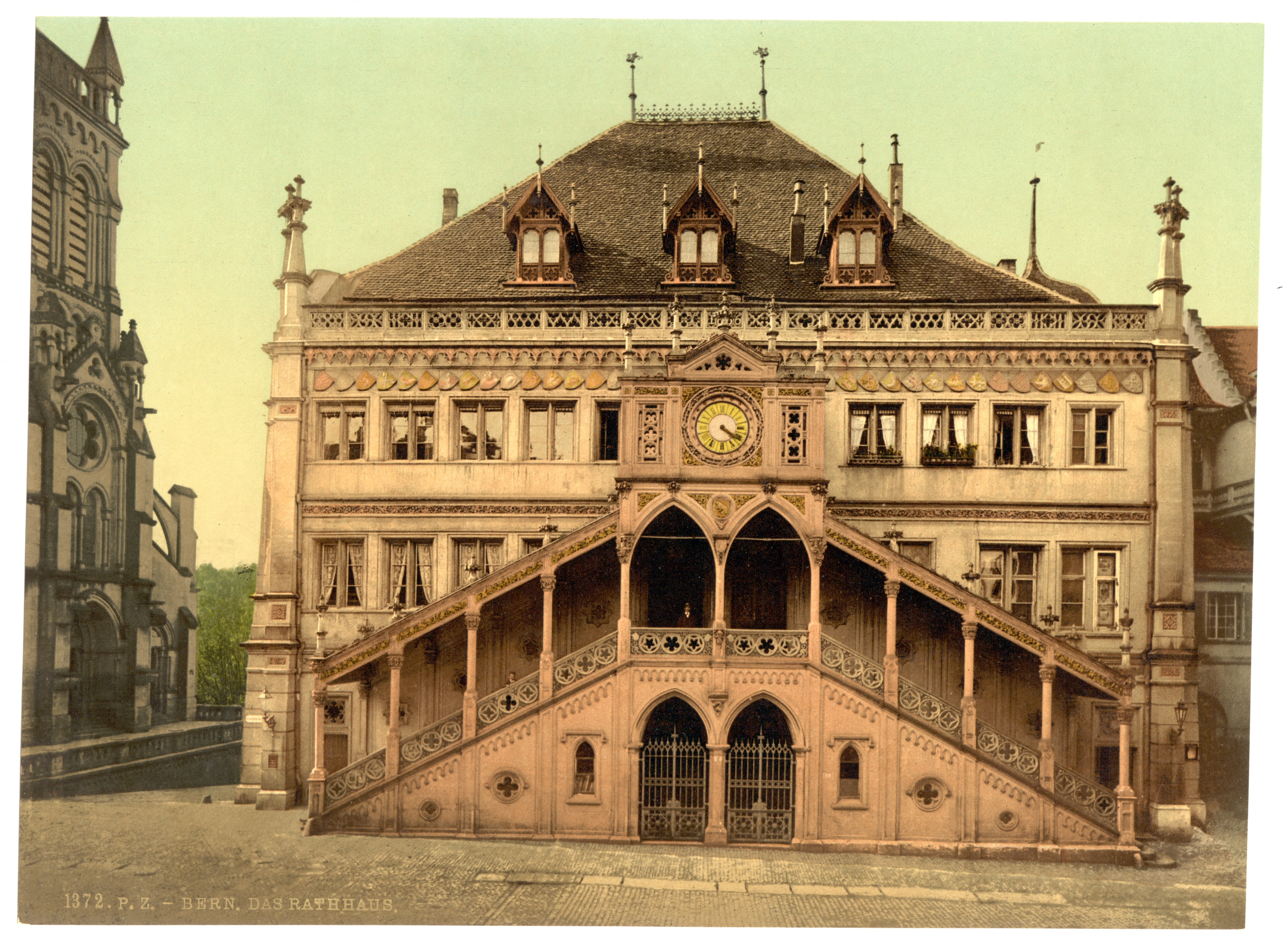
The town hall around 1890-1900

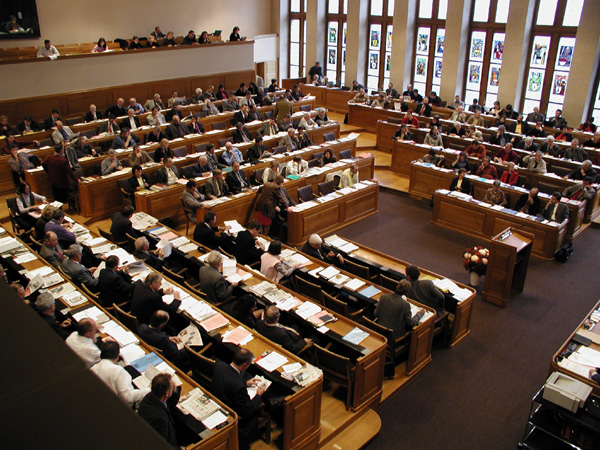
Session of the Grand Council in 2006.
