= Nydeggkirche =

Nydegg Church
- Nydeggkirche
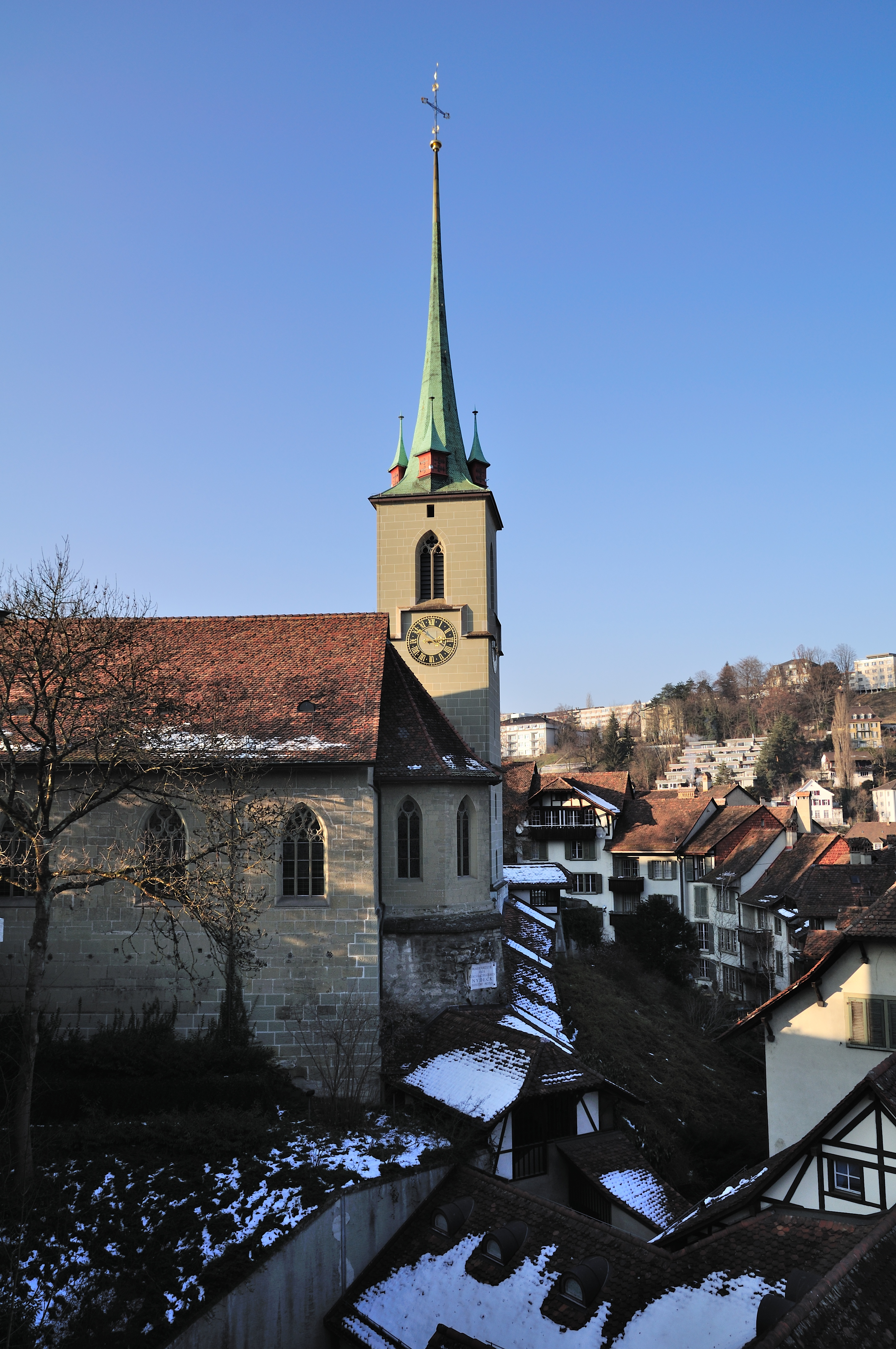
- The Nydeggkirche

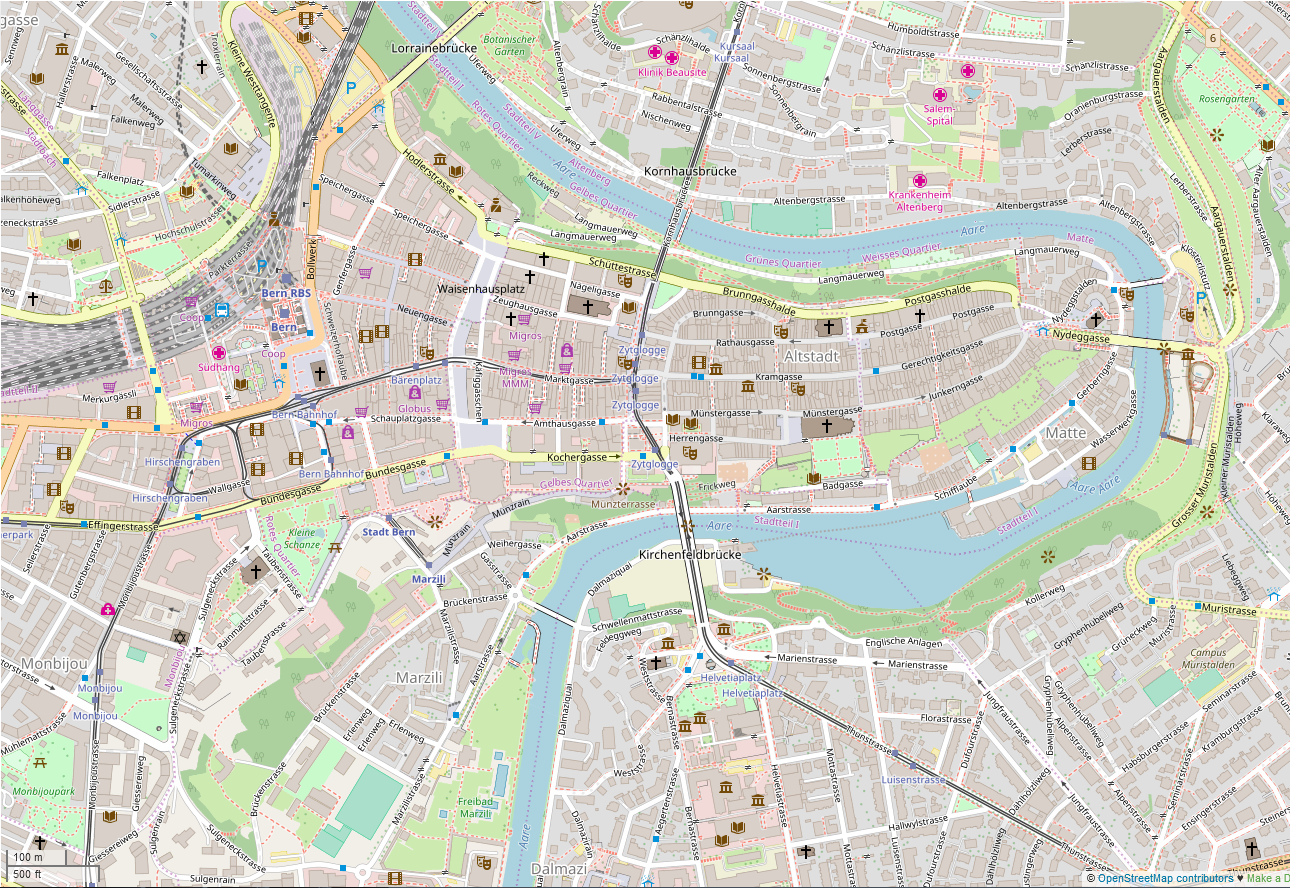
- 46°56′55.7″N 7°27′26.5″E
- Location: Bern
- Country: Switzerland
- Denomination: Swiss Reformed
- Previous denomination: Roman Catholic
- Website: www.nydegg.ch

History
- Status: Parish church
- Founded: 1341-1346
- Consecrated: 23 May 1346

Architecture
- Architectural type: Chapel
- Style: Late Gothic/Gothic Revival
- Groundbreaking: 1341
- Completed: 1346

Specifications
- Length: 31 m (102 ft)
- Height: 21.45 m (70.4 ft) (cornice)
- Materials: sandstone

The Reformed Nydeggkirche (from the Bernese German expression for "Lower corner") is located on the eastern edge of the Old City of Bern, in the Nydegg section.

== The castle Nydegg ==
The old town is situated on a peninsula in a loop of the Aare and developed in several expansion stages. The first occurred in 1191, as an existing settlement was expanded in the area of Nydeggkirche to the Clock Tower (Zytglogge). In 1190 Duke Berchtold V von Zähringen had built the castle Nydegg. After the extinction of the House of Zähringen, it came under the control of the city and was razed in 1266-73 by the inhabitants of Bern, in order to develop the Nydegg section. It possessed four corner towers and was located about where the current choir of the church stands.

== The Church ==
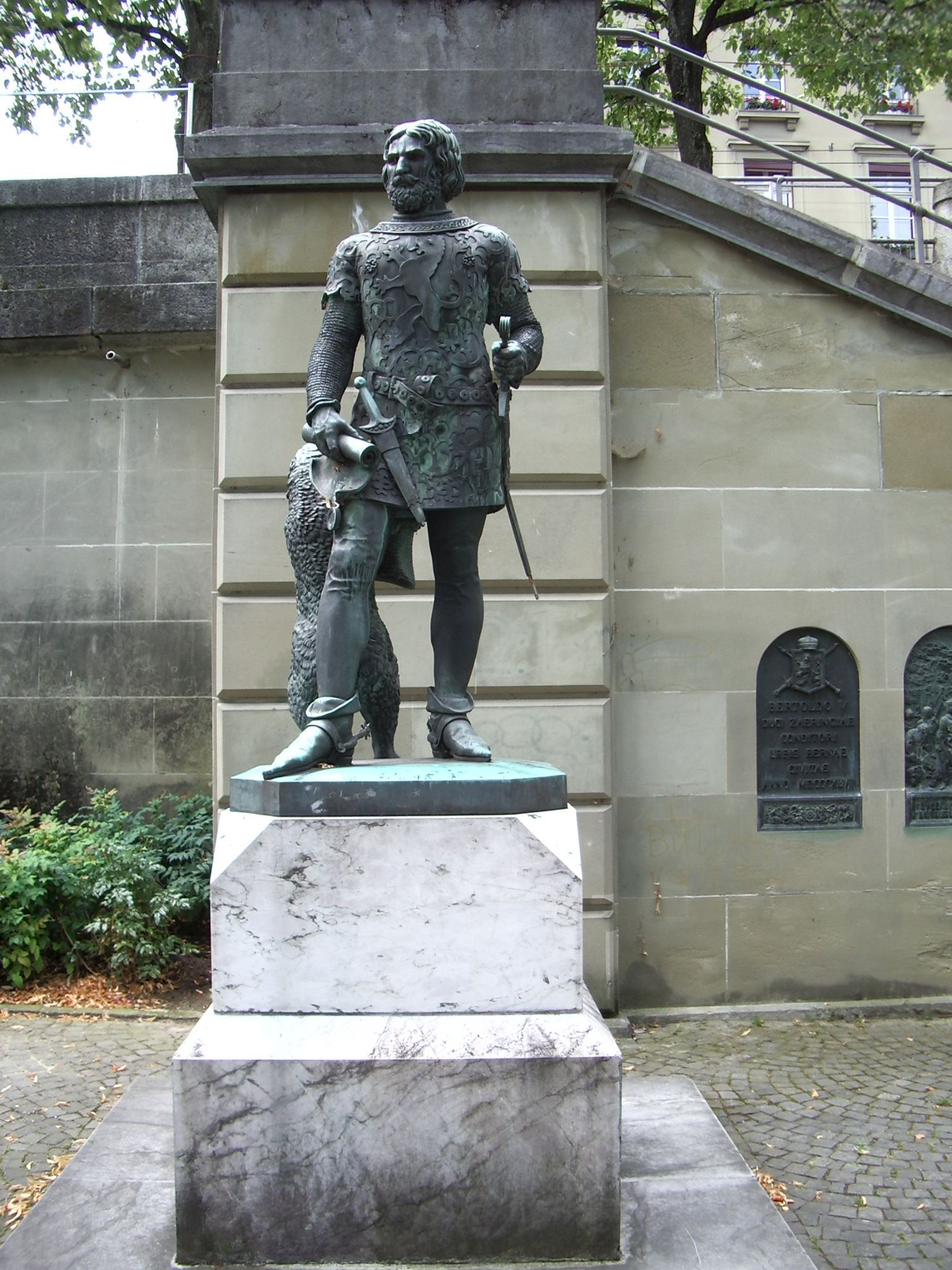
The Zähringer monument in Nydegghöfli

The original small church was built from 1341 to 1346 to replace the old fortress. It was first sanctified in March 1344, followed by a second on 23 May 1346. This early church featured a bell tower. On 12 January 1469 the city asked the Teutonic Order to donate the Nydegg chapel to the Mary Magdalene Brotherhood and to allow them to use the money paid to the chapel to rebuild the building. However, the city had to wait until the end of the Burgundian Wars (1472-1476) to begin the project. From 1480 to 1483 the city added a tower and from 1493 to 1504, a new nave was added. After the Protestant Reformation in 1529, the Nydeggkirche was transformed into a warehouse for barrels, timber and grain, but in 1566 again served as worship space. Beginning in 1566 it was cleaned out and minor renovations made to the windows and walls. However, in 1568 the bell tower roof caught fire and was destroyed. The new roof was finished and the damaged clock work repaired by the end of May 1571. The large wrought iron cross which tops the main spire was built by Caspar Brükessel during the same time. The current tower's appearance mostly dates back to the 1571 reconstruction. The later changes to the tower were fairly minor. For example, in 1625 four small embrasures or firing slits were broken out of the tower to help defend the city gate and in 1631 eight copper waterspouts were added to the roof.

Until 1721 it was a branch church of the Münster of Bern. Today's congregation forms part of the Reformed Churches of the Canton Bern-Jura-Solothurn.

In 1863, the church was extended to the west and an entrance from the Nydeggbrücke (Nydegg Bridge) was added. Then, from 1951 to 1953 a total renovation happened. During the renovation, bronze reliefs by Marcel Perincioli were added to the main entrance at Nydegghöfli and the entrance to the bridge.

The Nydegghöflibrunnen or Stalden fountain was added to a niche under Nydegggasse at Nydegghöfli in 1857. Then, in 1968, the Zähringer monument at Nydegghöfli was erected, which had previously been on the Munster platform.

== The bronze reliefs ==
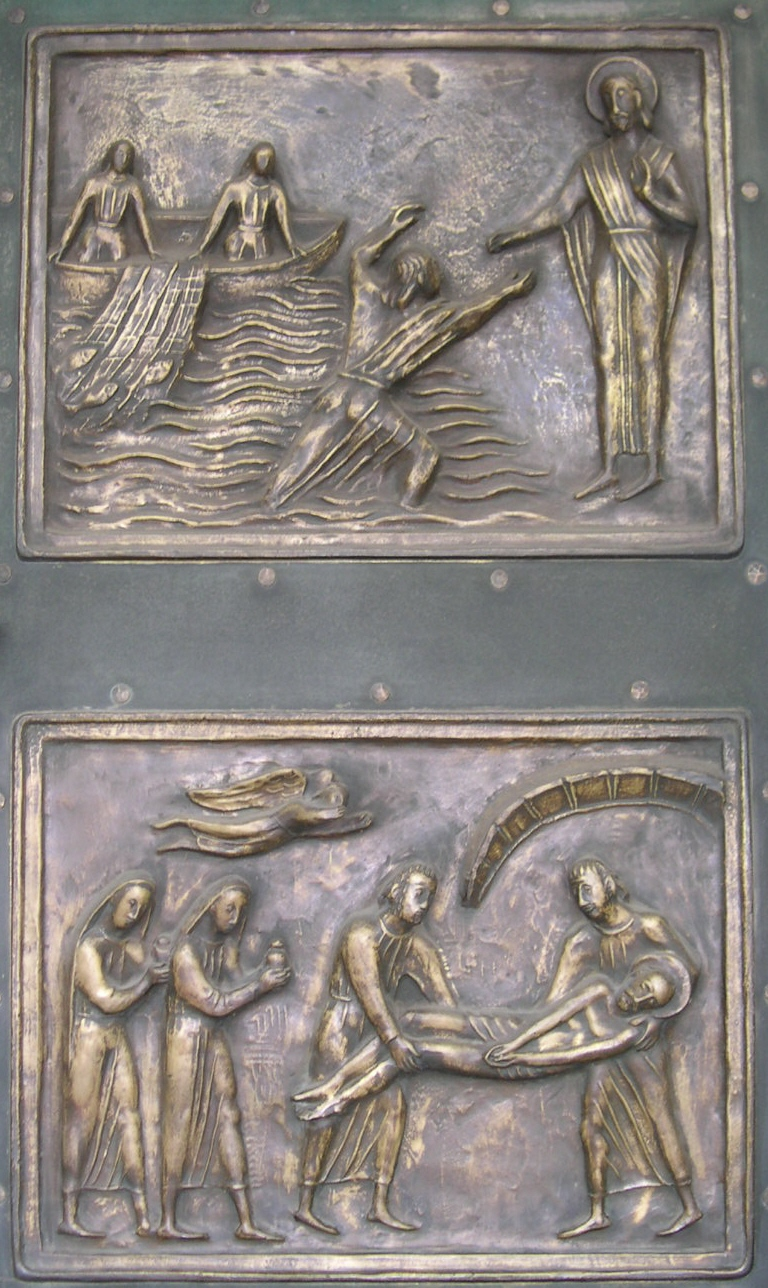
Two Reliefs from the bridge side door

In 1956, bronze reliefs by Perincioli were inspired by medieval role models in front of San Zeno in Verona and the Cathedral of Hildesheim.

On the main door, you can see scenes from the life and work of Jesus, on the left wing, from top to bottom:

- The announcement of the birth of Jesus to the shepherds (Luke 2:8-14)
- The baptism of Jesus (Mark 1:1-11)
- Sermon on the Mount (Matthew 5-7)
- The healing of a paralytic (Mark 2:1-12)

and on the right wing:

- The birth of Jesus in the stable at Bethlehem (Luke 2)
- The temptation of Jesus (Mark 1:12 f.)
- The miraculous feeding (Mark 6:30-44)
- The Raising of Lazarus (John 11:17 ff)

On the Brückentüre are on the left wing, from top to bottom are following scenes:

- The women come to the grave of Jesus (Mark 16:1-8)
- Jesus before Pontius Pilate (Mark 15:1-5)
- The foot washing (John 13:1-20)
- The anointing at Bethany (John 12:1-10)

and on the right wing:

- The risen Christ on the Sea of Galilee (John 21:1-14)
- The burial of Jesus (John 19:38-42)
- Jesus in Gethsemane (Mark 14:32-42)
- The entrance to Jerusalem (John 12:12-19)

== Notable Pastors ==
Worked as a chaplain at the Nydeggkirche

- Jeremiah Lorza (from 1800 to 1832)
- Edward Guedes (from 1855)
- Kurt Marti (from 1961 to 1983)

On 8 July 1995, the pastor of Nydeggkirche, Bäumlin Klaus (born 1938), caused a media storm following his offering of a blessing service for same-sex couple for Stephan Diggelmann and Bareld Storm.
