= Paul Scherrer (disambiguation) =

Paul Scherrer (1890–1969) was a Swiss physicist.

Paul Scherrer may also refer to:

- Paul Scherrer Institute (PSI), a multi-disciplinary research institute in Switzerland
- Paul Scherrer (actor) (born 1968), American film and television actor
- Paul Scherrer (politician) (1862–1935), President of the Swiss Council of States
