= Cimetière des Rois =

Cemetery in Geneva, Switzerland

Coordinates: 46°12′07″N 6°08′11″E

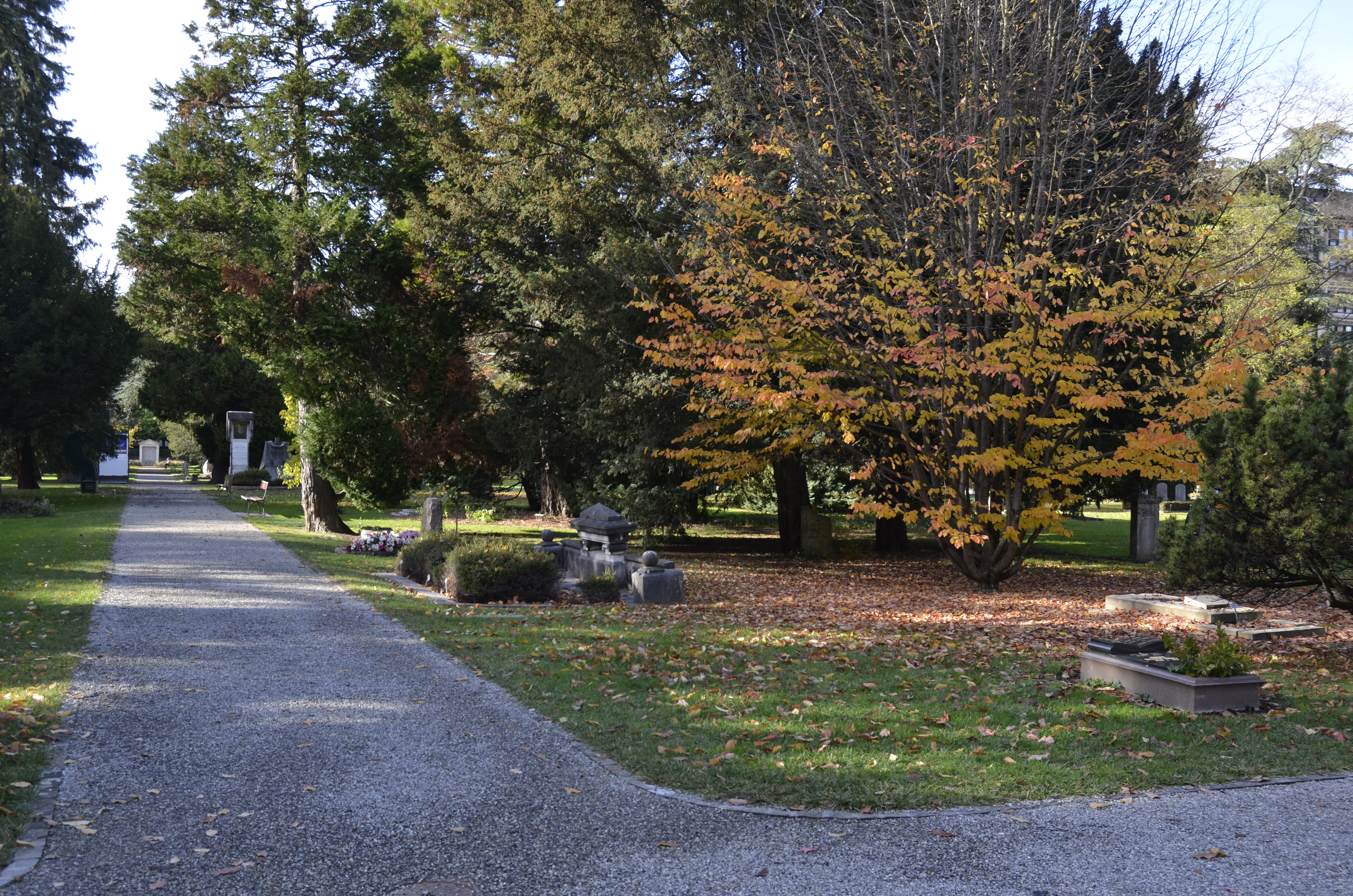
Central pathway, Plainpalais cemetery

The Cimetière des Rois (French: Cemetery of Kings) (officially Cimetière de Plainpalais) is a cemetery in Geneva, Switzerland. The cemetery is commonly named after la rue des Rois (French: Kings' Street) near which it is situated. The graveyard was established in 1482 for people who died from plague in the Middle Ages, during the second plague pandemic.

== Notable burials ==
The right to rest in the cemetery of Plainpalais is strictly limited. Under Article 30 (3) of the City of Geneva Cemeteries Regulations, only "magistrates and distinguished personalities, having contributed by their life and activity to the influence of Geneva" can claim a concession whose request must be made to the Administrative Council.

In the cemetery are buried John Calvin (the Protestant reformer), Jorge Luis Borges (the Argentine author), Sérgio Vieira de Mello (the former UN High Commissioner for Human Rights), Ernest Ansermet (renowned Swiss conductor), and Jean Piaget (the noted developmental psychologist and epistemologist). The composers Frank Martin, Alberto Ginastera, Denis de Rougemont, Griselidis Real and Alice Rivaz, Jeanne de Salzmann, chemist Humphry Davy, editor François Lachenal, Robert Musil and actor François Simon are also buried there. Politicians are also buried there, such as Adrien Lachenal (President of the Confederation), Paul Lachenal, Antoine Carteret, Willy Donzé, and Gustave Moynier (President of the Red Cross). Max van Berchem (founder of Arabic epigraphy), and Eglantyne Jebb (founder of Save the Children, drafter of Declaration of the Rights of the Child)

== Gallery ==
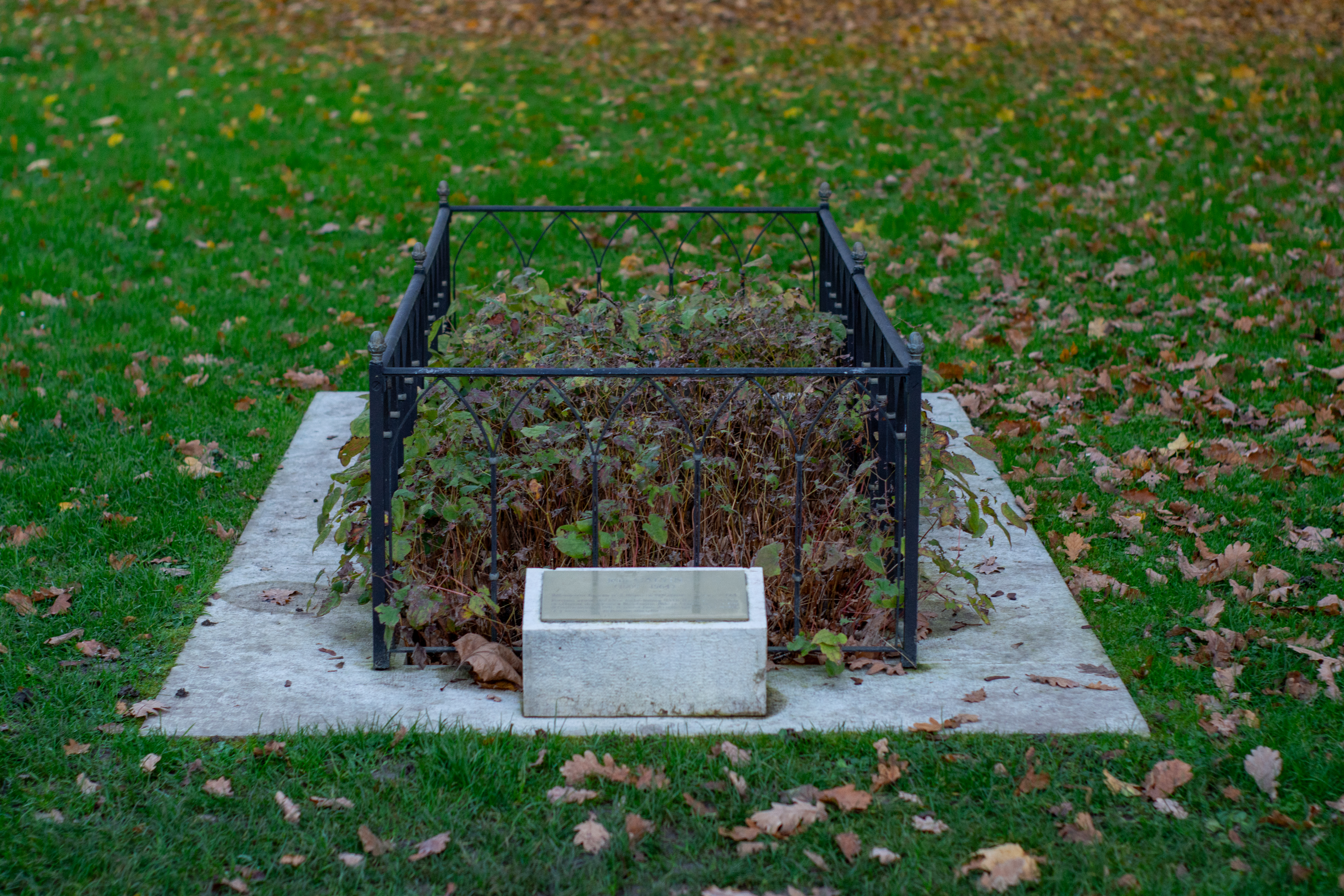
Traditional grave of Calvin; the exact location of the grave in the cemetery is unknown

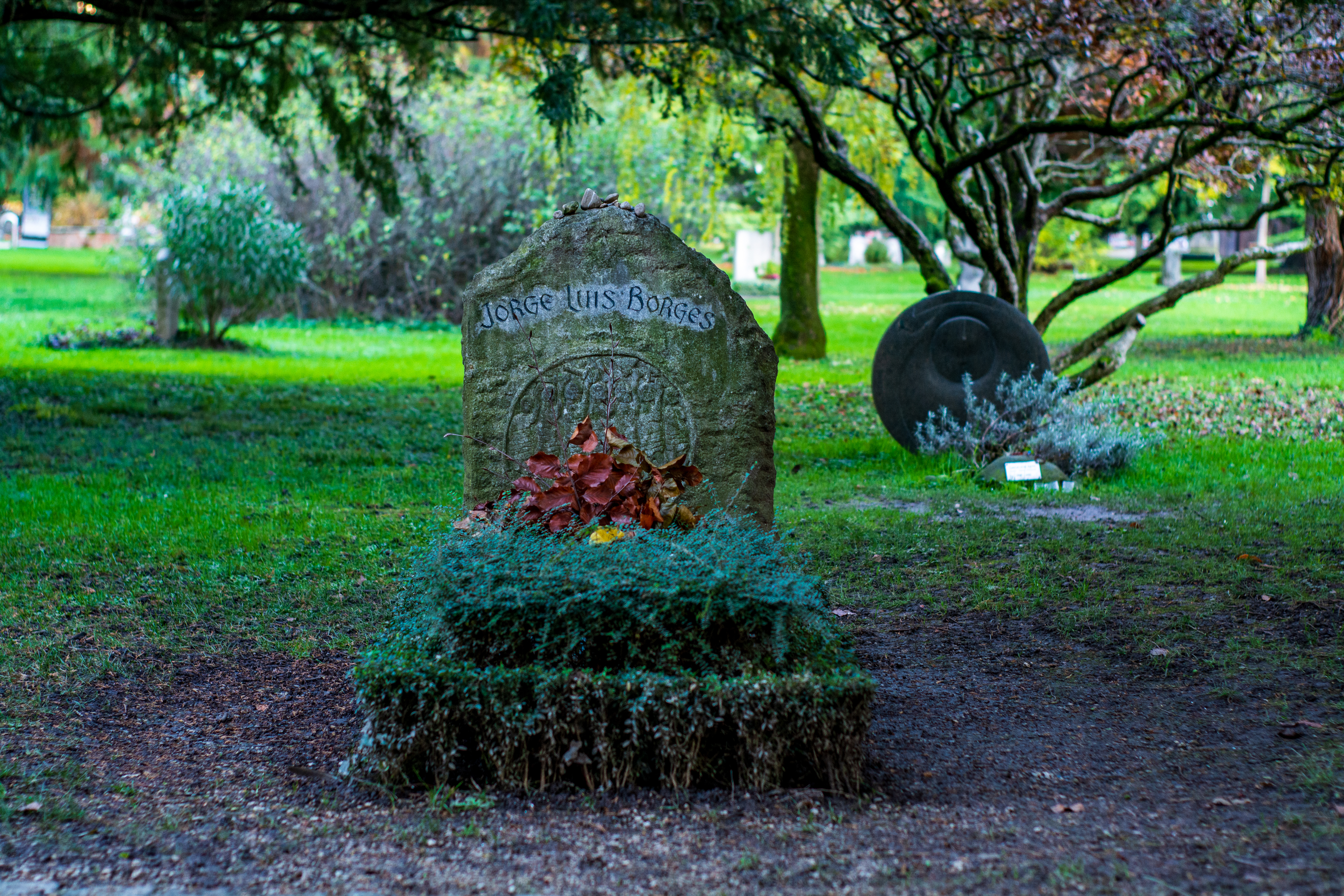
The grave of Jorge Luis Borges

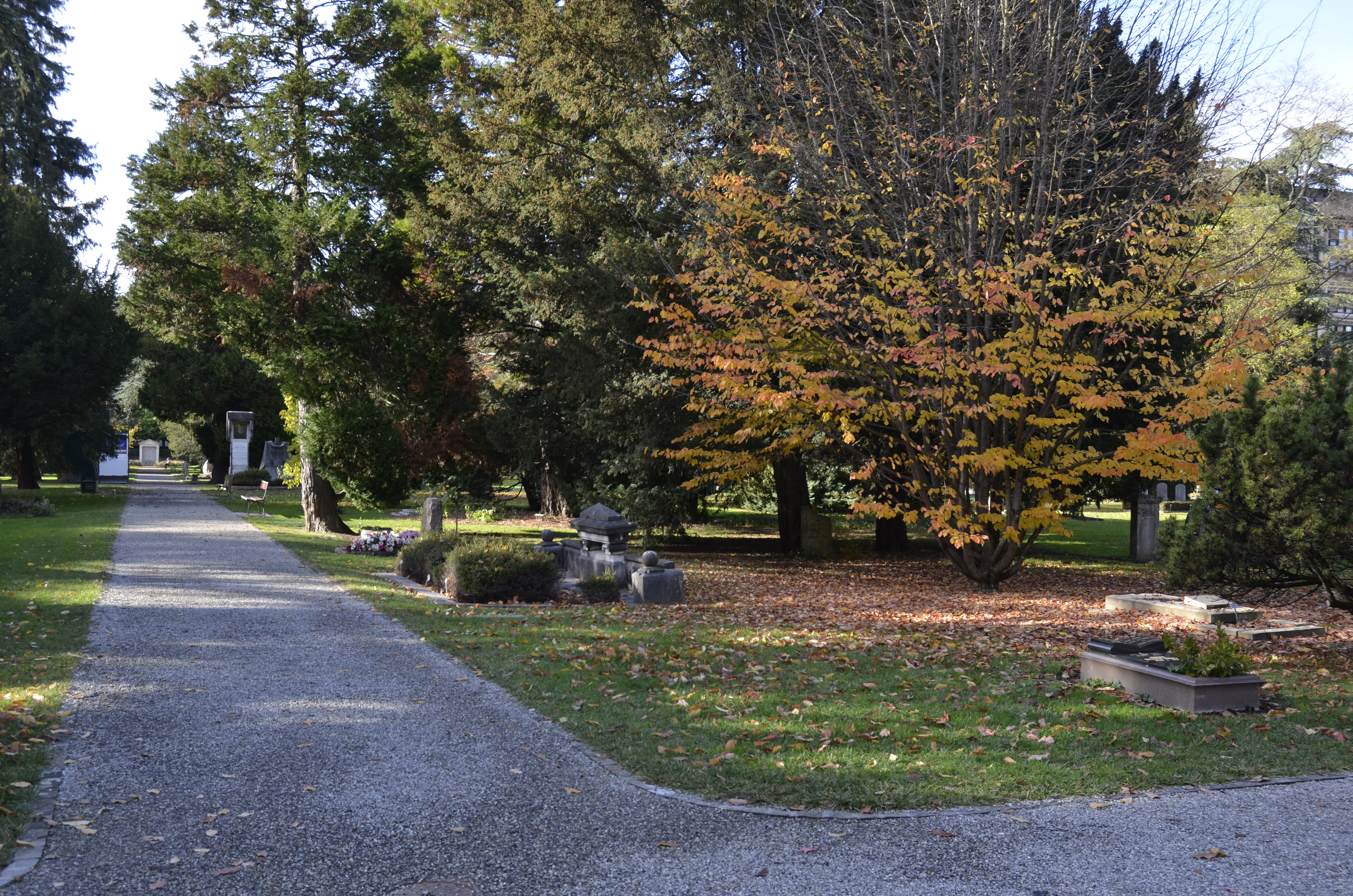
Central pathway, Plainpalais cemetery

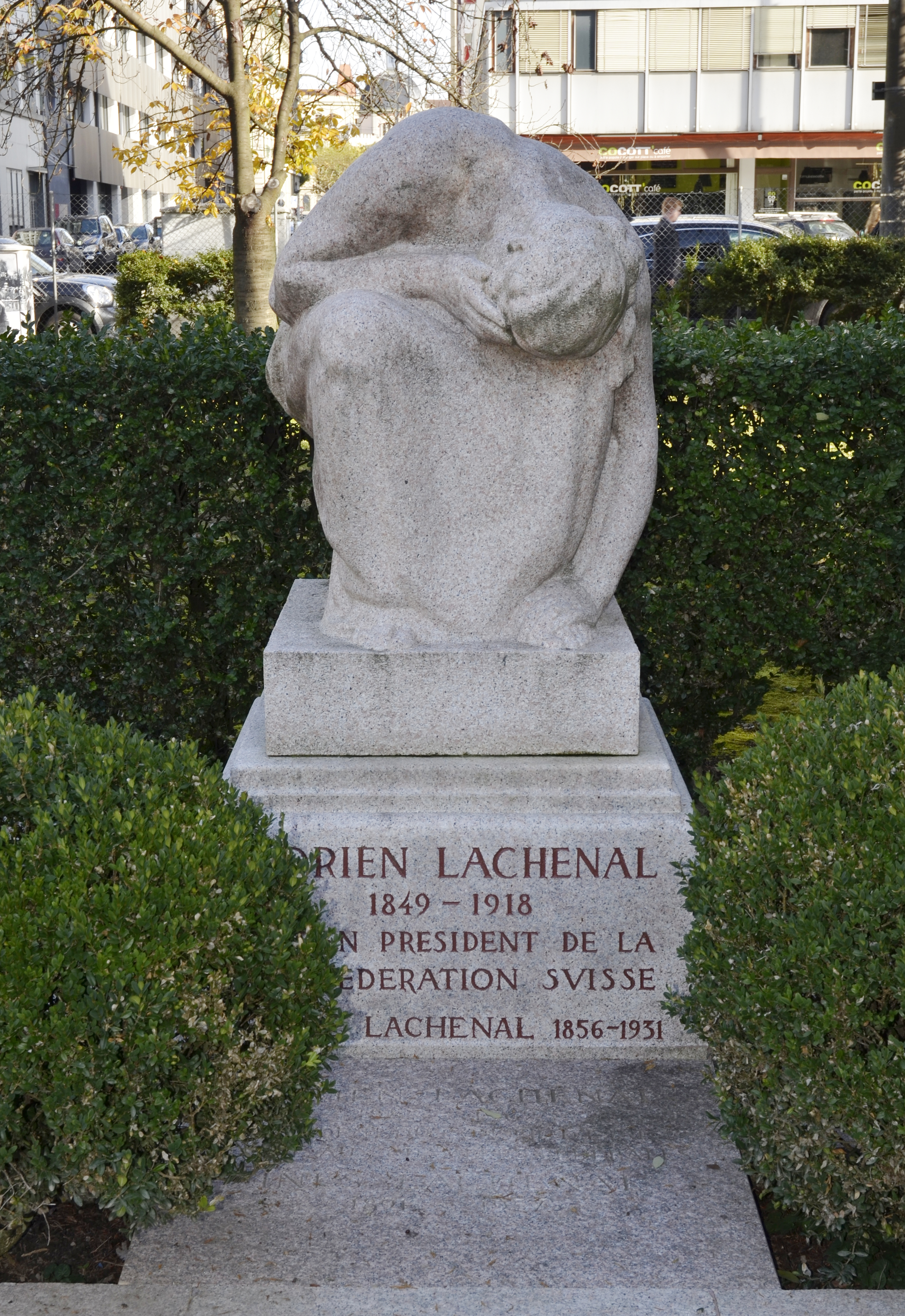
The grave of Swiss President Adrien Lachenal

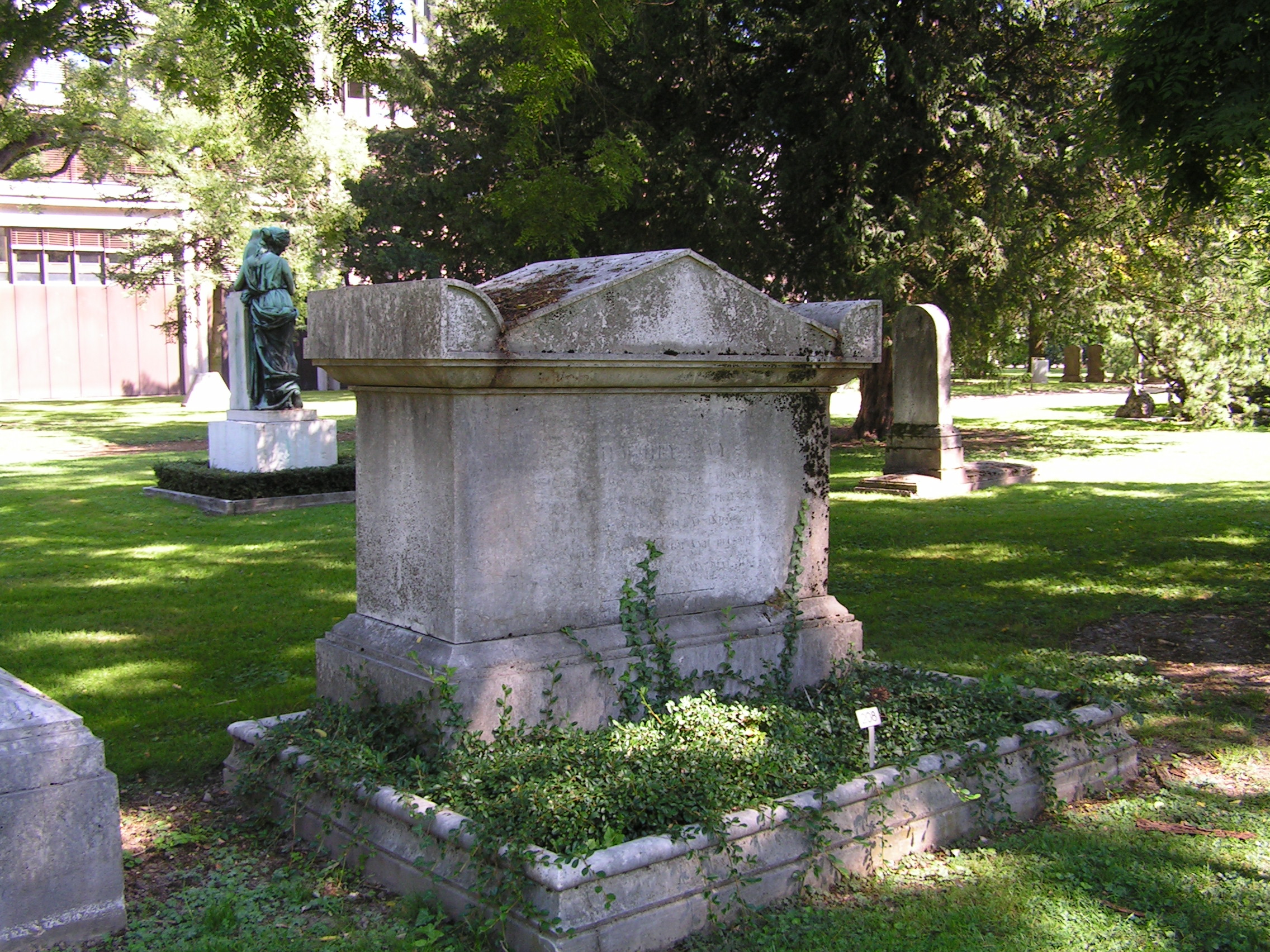
The grave of notable British scientist Sir Humphry Davy

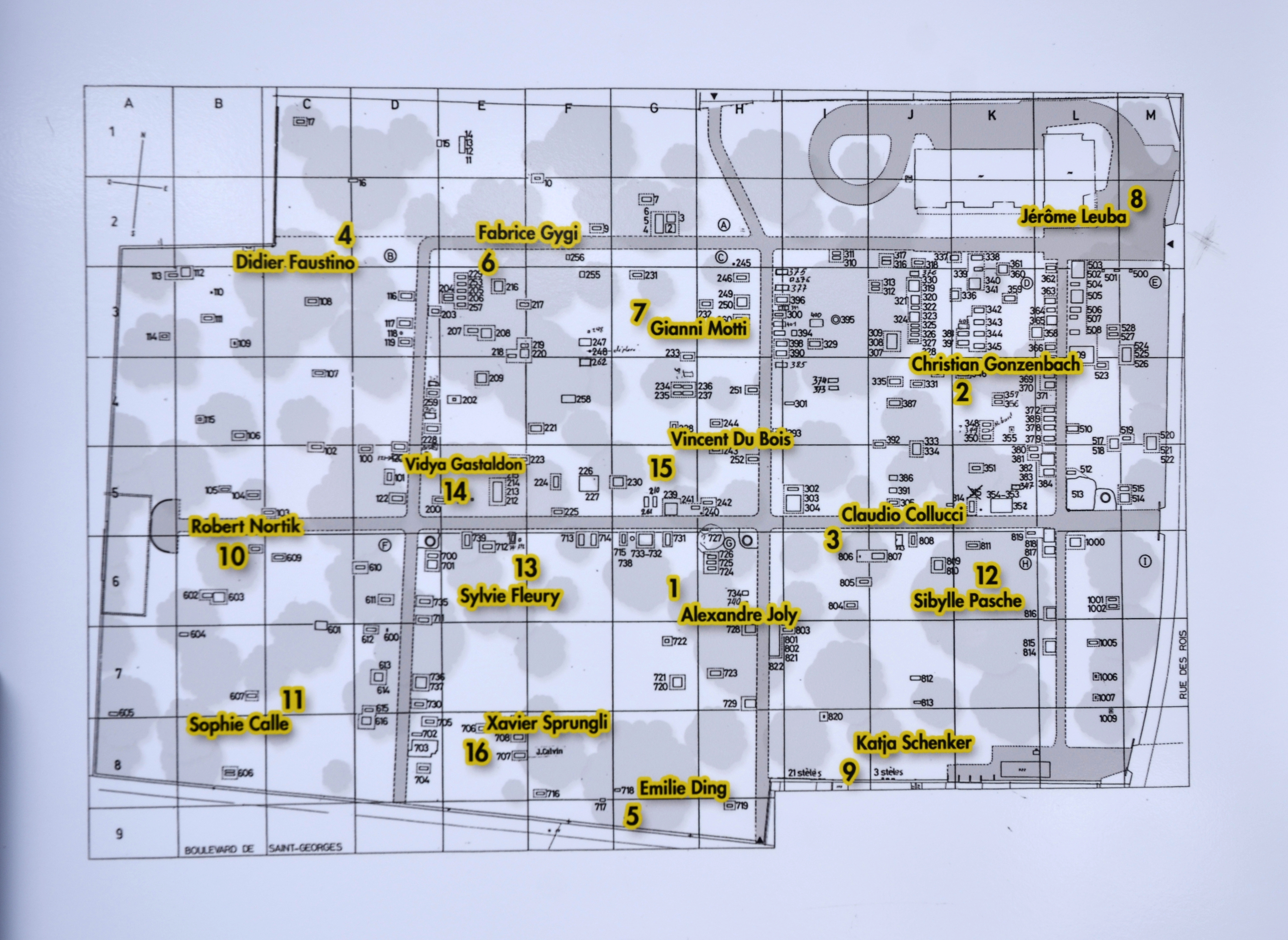
Map of the Kings Cemetery, Geneva

== See also ==
- Plainpalais
