= François Lachenal =

Swiss publisher and diplomat (1918–1997)

François Paul Lachenal (Geneva 31 May 1918 – 22 August 1997) was a Swiss publisher and diplomat, who beginning in 1940 played a significant role in publishing the writings of the French authors during the occupation of France by Germany. He was member of the Swiss delegation in Vichy till 1944 and later till 1945 at the Swiss embassy in Berlin. Publisher of the magazine Traits he was son of Genevan politician Paul Lachenal, nephew of The president of the Swiss Confederation Adrien Lachenal and married to Johanna Bertha Caroline Otken. He is buried at the Cimetière des Rois in the Plainpalais district of Geneva.

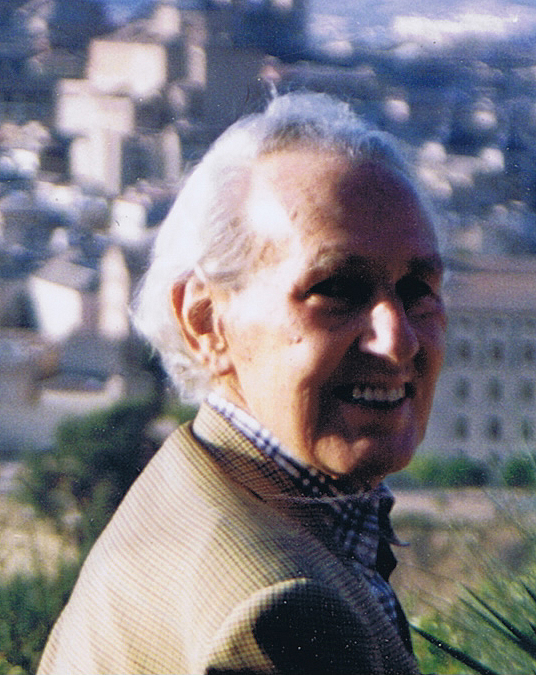
François Lachenal

== Publisher ==
It is due to his occupation as diplomat that he was able to safeguard and transport important manuscripts of French writers of the French Résistance into Switzerland, like Le Silence de la mer by Vercors, which he published at Les Éditions de Minuit and Les Trois Collines which continued its activities until 1965. He published fifty editions of the literary magazine Traits and hundreds of titles under this label.

With Pierre Seghers, Paul Éluard and Jean Lescure, he gathers in 1943 the texts of many poets of the French Resistance, which he published in Les Éditions de Minuit under the title: L’honneur des poètes.

From 1944 onwards, Lachenal, published and edited for Les Trois Collines the series Les Grands Peintres par leurs amis including a collection of poems by Paul Éluard with works by Pablo Picasso 1946 followed by Braque le patron by Jean Paulhan, 1947 Chagall ou l'orage enchanté by Raïssa Maritain 1948, and Fernand Léger et le nouvel espace by Douglas Cooper. 1949. Lachenal is also the publisher of Voir by Paul Éluard, a group of poems dedicated to the painters who are close to him.

François Lachenal entrusted the Archives (1940-1965) of these publications, complete collections and correspondence with printers and writers, to the Institute for Contemporary Publishing Archives and the Universitz of Lausanne.

In February 1944, Lachenal obtained, as a member of the Delegation in Lyon, a passport of protection for Gertrud Stein and Alice B. Toklas. These documents declared them temporary residents in France and therefore gave them the right to enter Switzerland.

In 1989 he worked for the exhibition "From Greco to Goya", supported by his nephew Daniel Garbade, an exhibition in honor of the rescue of Masterpieces of the Prado Museum in Geneva in 1939.

From 1959 till 1997 he directed the ''Internationale Tage'' ("International Days"), a cultural festival with expositions organized for Boehringer Ingelheim.

In 1995, an exhibition was organized in Paris at the Centre Culturel Suisse, depicting his life as an editor and his role as a textual artist during the war.

== Bibliography ==
By François Lachenal

- François Lachenal (foreword by Jean Lescure), Éditions des Trois Collines, Genève-Paris (= L’edition contemporaine.) IMEC, Paris 1995, ISBN 2-908295-26-1.
- François Lachenal, Robert Boehringer (sous la dir. de): Ingelheim am Rhein. 774–1974. Boehringer-Ingelheim 1974.

About François Lachenal

- Exposition Résistance–Déportation, Création dans le bruit des armes. Chancellerie de l’Ordre de la Libération, Paris 1980.
- Lucien Scheler, La grande espérance des poètes, 1940–1945 (= Littérature Française.) Paris, Temps actuels, 1982, ISBN 2-201-01569-4.
- Jean Lescure, Poésie et liberté : histoire de Messages, 1939–1946 (= Edit. Contemporaine.) Editions de L’IMEC, Paris 1998, ISBN 2-908295-38-5.
- Archives des années noires. Artistes, écrivains et éditeurs Documents réunis et présentés par Claire Paulhan et Olivier Corpet, préface de Jérôme Prieur, Institut Mémoires de l’édition contemporaine, Paris, 2004, ISBN 2-908295-71-7.
- Robert O. Paxton, Olivier Corpet, Claire Paulhan, Archives de la vie littéraire sous l'Occupation, À travers le désastre. Éditions Taillandier et les Éditions de l’IMEC, 2009, ISBN 978-2-84734-585-8, S. 230, 256, 259, 282, 299, 302, 306, 312–315 und 336.
