= Karl Zeerleder =

Swiss politician & first mayor of Bern (1780–1851)

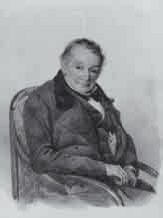

1st Mayor of Bern
- In office 1832–1848
- Preceded by: None
- Succeeded by: Friedrich Ludwig von Effinger

Member of the Grand Council of Bern
- In office 1816–1831

Member of the Small Council of Bern
- In office 1827–1830

Personal details
- Born: 31 December 1780 Bern, Switzerland
- Died: 28 June 1851 (aged 70) Mont Vully, Switzerland
- Party: Conservative

Karl Zeerleder (31 December 1780 in Bern – 28 June 1851 in Mont Vully) was a Swiss politician who served as the first mayor of Bern.

== Early life ==
Karl Zeerleder was born in Bern on 31 December 1780 to banker Ludwig Zeerleder and Sophie Charlotte von Haller. Zeerleder was educated by private tutors and followed further education in a parsonage in the canton of Vaud. At the age of 16, Zeerleder began working in the chancellery of Bern. In 1798, during the French invasion of Switzerland, Zeerleder assisted his brother Ludwig in saving the state treasury and taking it to the Bernese Oberland.

== Political Career & Death ==
Zeerleder was appointed secretary of the Helvetic Ministry of Justice in 1798 and served in that role until the dissolution of the Helvetic Republic in 1803. Following this, Zeerleder became a member of the Council of Justice until 1813, devoting himself to historical studies during his tenure. He also served as a member of the Grand Council of Bern from 1816 to 1831 and the Small Council from 1827 to 1830. Zeerleder was also the president of the Swiss Historical Society (Schweizerischen geschichtforschenden Gesellschaft) from 1831 to 1840. Zeerleder became the first Mayor (Gemeindepräsident) of Bern in 1832 and served in that position until 1848, when he was replaced by Friedrich Ludwig von Effinge following the founding of the Federal Republic of Switzerland in 1848. After his tenure as mayor, Zeerleder retired from politics and died in 1851 on his estate in Mont Vully.

== See also ==
- List of mayors of Bern

Preceded by None	Mayor of Bern, Switzerland; 1832–1848	Succeeded by Friedrich Ludwig von Effinger
