= Alexander Tschäppät =

Swiss politician

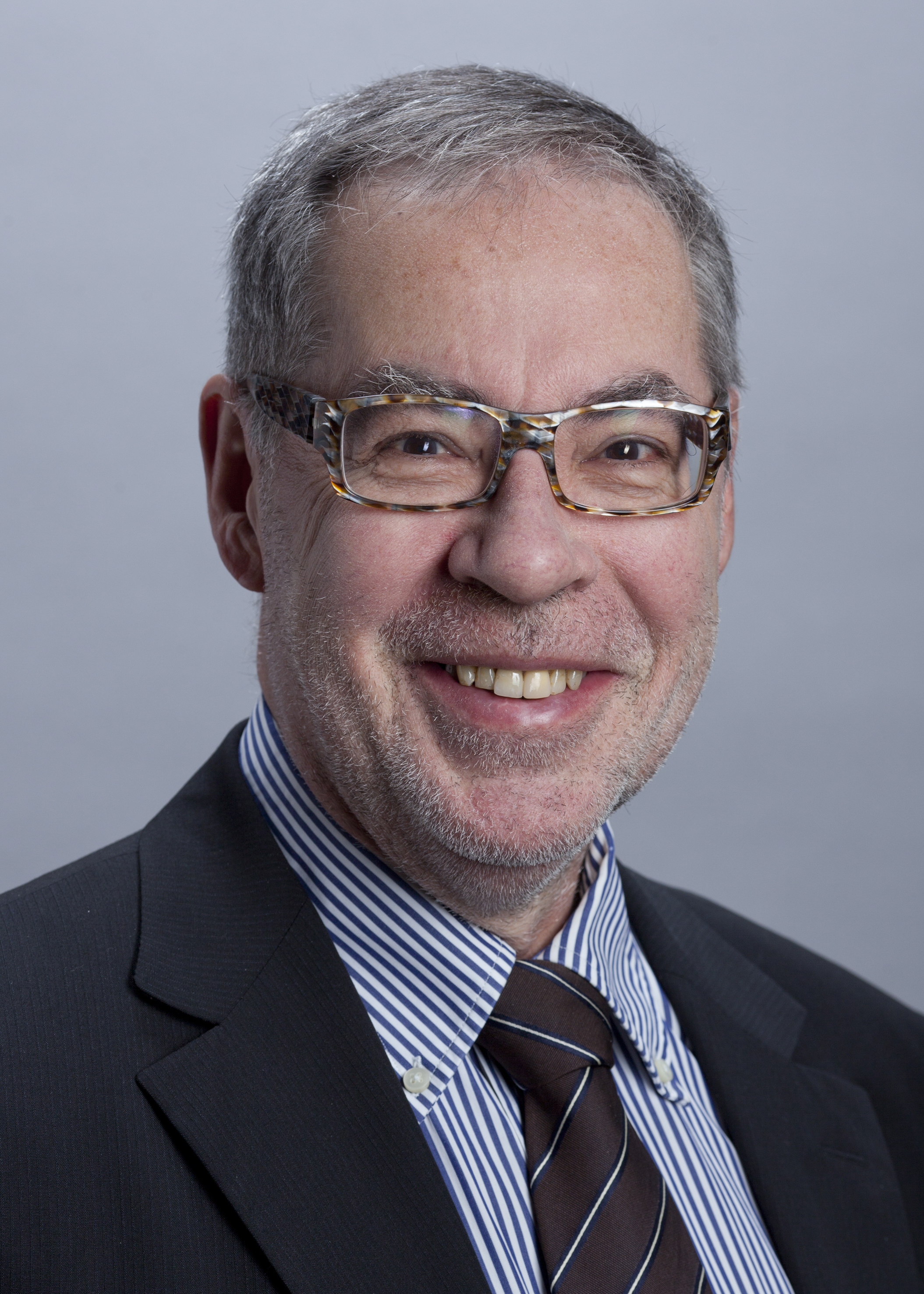

Mayor of Bern
- In office 2005–2016
- Preceded by: Klaus Baumgartner

Personal details
- Born: 16 April 1952 Bern
- Died: 4 May 2018 (aged 66) Bern
- Occupation: Politician

Alexander Tschäppät (16 April 1952 – 4 May 2018) was a Swiss politician. Tschäppät was a member of the Social Democratic Party of Switzerland. He has been a member of the National Council of Switzerland from 1991 to 2003 and again 2011 to 2018. He was mayor (Stadtpräsident) of Bern 2005 until 2016.

== Biography ==
Tschäppät was born on 16 April 1952 in Bern to Reynold Tschäppät and Lily Bürki.

== See also ==
- Politics of Switzerland

Preceded by Klaus Baumgartner	Mayor of Bern; 2005-2016	Succeeded by Alec von Graffenried
