= Friedrich Ludwig von Effinger =

Swiss politician

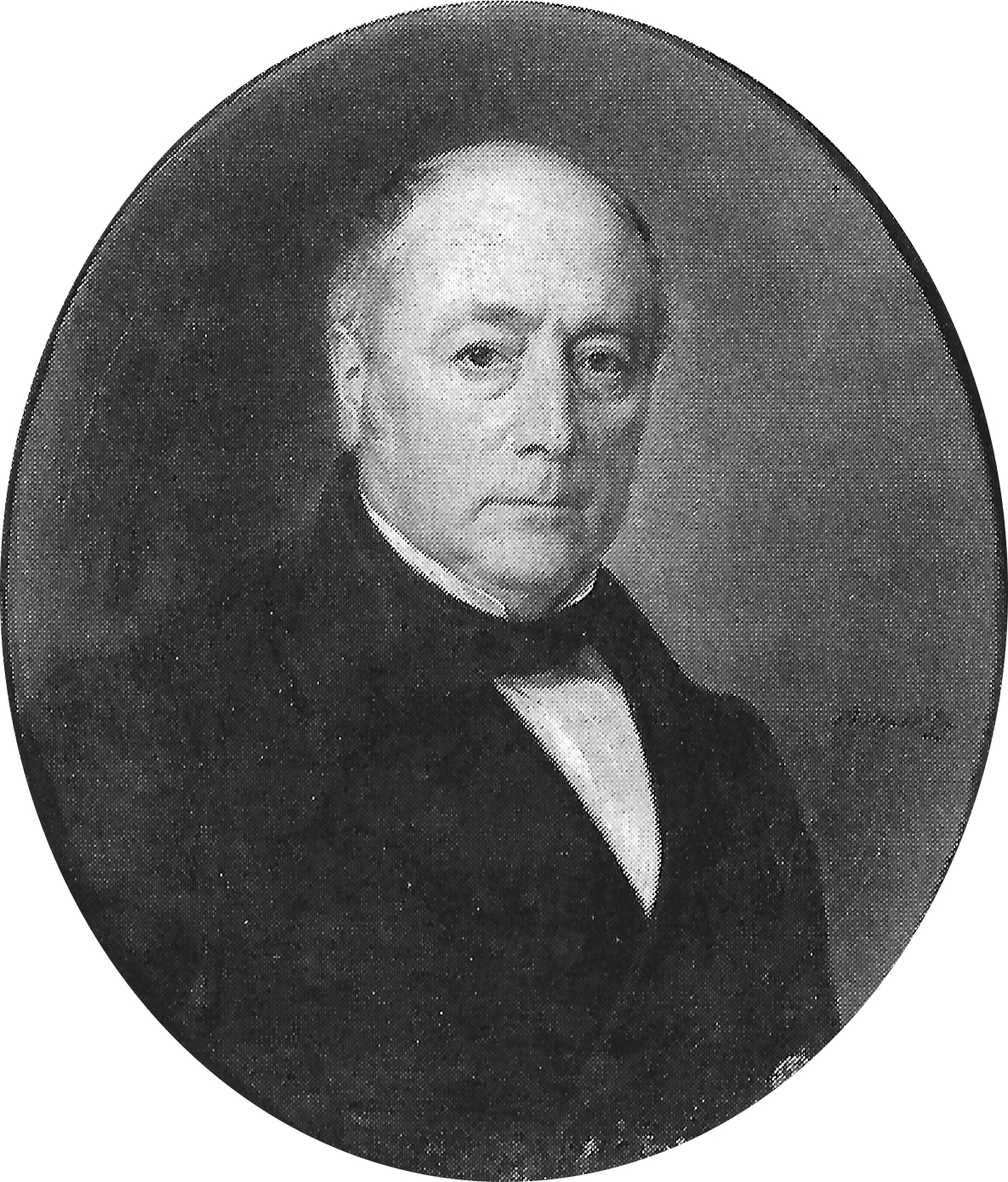

2nd Mayor of Bern
- In office 1849–1863
- Preceded by: Karl Zeerleder
- Succeeded by: Christoph Albert Kurz

Member of the Grand Council of the Canton of Bern
- In office 1824–1831

First Secretary of the Secret Council
- In office 1825–1829

Member of the Grand Council of Bern
- In office 1831–1832

Vice-President of the Grand Council of Bern
- In office 1832–1832

Member of the Grand Council of Bern
- In office 1850–1858

Personal details
- Born: 29 August 1795 Bern, Switzerland
- Died: 17 March 1867 (aged 71) Bern, Switzerland
- Party: Conservative
- Spouse: Catharina Julie Adelheid Jenner (m. 1822)

Friedrich Ludwig von Effinger (born 29 August 1795 in Bern - died 17 March 1867 in Bern) was a Swiss politician who served as the second mayor of Bern.

== Personal life ==
Friedrich Ludwig von Effinger studied law in Bern, Berlin and Göttingen. He joined the state service in 1820. He married Catharina Julie Adelheid Jenner in 1822.

== Political career ==
von Effinger was a member of the Grand Council of the Canton of Bern from 1824 to 1831 and first secretary of the secret council from 1825 to 1829. After the Regeneration in the canton of Bern, he was employed by the city of Bern. He was a member of the Grand Council of Bern from 1831 to 1832 and he was vice president of the council in 1832, he became a member again from 1850 to 1858. In 1833 he was chairman of the finance committee bourgeois.

He was elected municipal president (mayor) of Bern in 1849, thereby succeeding Karl Zeerleder. He was Mayor until 1863. He was called the "Architect of the Federal Capital," because under his rule, they began the large-scale renovation of the city of Bern. He retired from politics in 1858 and he died in Bern on 17 March 1867.

== See also ==
- List of mayors of Bern

Preceded by Karl Zeerleder	Mayor of Bern, Switzerland; 1849–1863	Succeeded by Christoph Albert Kurz
