= Eduard Müller (Swiss politician) =

Swiss politician (1848–1919)

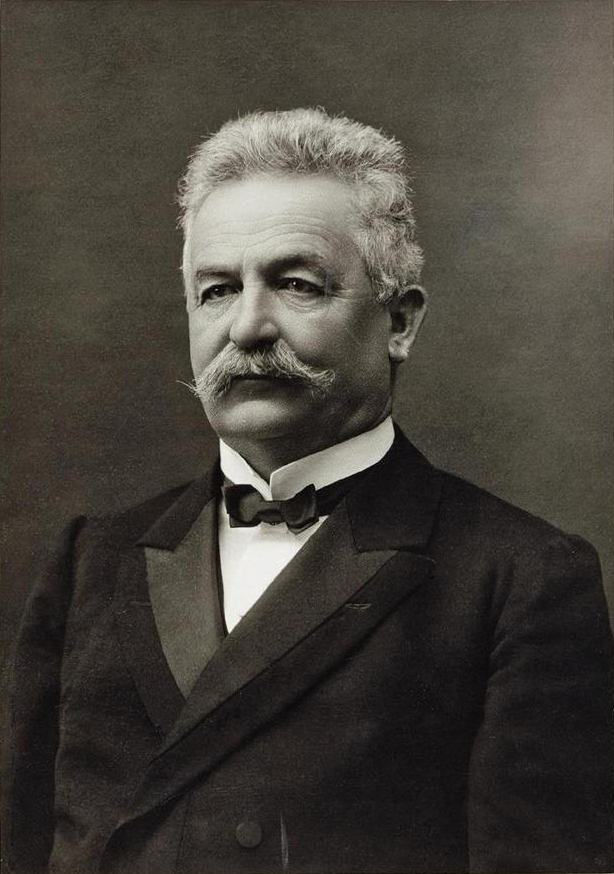
- Müller in 1913

President of Switzerland
- In office 1 January 1913 – 31 December 1913
- Preceded by: Ludwig Forrer
- Succeeded by: Arthur Hoffmann
- In office 1 January 1907 – 31 December 1907
- Preceded by: Ludwig Forrer
- Succeeded by: Ernst Brenner
- In office 1 January 1899 – 31 December 1899
- Preceded by: Eugène Ruffy
- Succeeded by: Walter Hauser

Swiss Federal Councillor
- In office 16 August 1895 – 9 November 1919
- Preceded by: Karl Schenk
- Succeeded by: Karl Scheurer

6th Mayor of Bern
- In office 1888–1895
- Preceded by: Otto von Büren
- Succeeded by: Franz Lindt

Personal details
- Born: 12 November 1848 Dresden, Kingdom of Saxony
- Died: 9 November 1919 (aged 70) Bern, Switzerland
- Party: Free Democratic Party

Eduard Müller (12 November 1848 – 9 November 1919) was a Swiss politician who was Mayor of Bern (1888–1895), President of the Swiss National Council (1890/1891) and member of the Swiss Federal Council (1895–1919). He was a member of the Free Democratic Party.

== Member of the Federal Council ==
Müller was elected to the Federal Council of Switzerland on 16 August 1895.

While he was in office, he held the following departments:

- Department of Justice and Police (1895–1897)
- Military Department (1897–1898)
- Political Department (1899) as President of the Confederation
- Military Department (1900–1906)
- Political Department (1907) as President of the Confederation
- Military Department (1908–1911)
- Department of Justice and Police (1912)
- Political Department (1913) as President of the Confederation
- Department of Justice and Police (1914–1919)

=== Electoral information ===
Müller was elected to the federal council on one ballot with 136 votes.

- Ballots distributed: 171
- Ballots received: 170
- Blank ballots: 6
- Spoiled ballots: 0
- Valid ballots: 164
- Absolute majority: 83

He died in office on 9 November 1919 at the age of 70.

Political offices
Preceded by Otto von Büren	Mayor of Bern, Switzerland; 1888–1895	Succeeded by Franz Lindt
Preceded by August Suter	President of the National Council; 1890–1891	Succeeded by Adrien Lachenal
Preceded by Karl Schenk	Member of the Swiss Federal Council; 1895–1919	Succeeded by Karl Scheurer
