= Otto von Büren =

Swiss politician

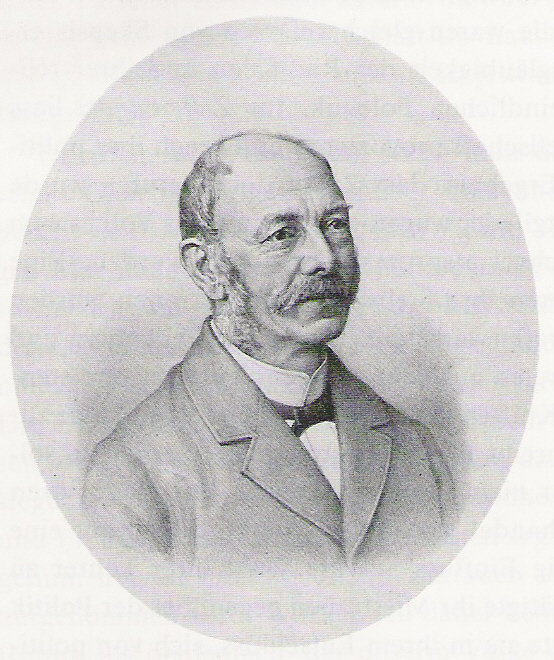

4th Mayor of Bern
- In office 1864–1888
- Preceded by: Christoph Albert Kurz
- Succeeded by: Eduard Müller

Member of the Grand Council of the Canton of Bern
- In office 1850–1888

Member of the National Council
- In office 4 July 1864 – 30 November 1884

Personal details
- Born: 19 September 1822 Bern, Switzerland
- Died: 25 December 1888 (aged 66) Bern, Switzerland
- Party: Conservative
- Spouse: Henriette von Sinner
- Education: university of Bern

Rudolf Otto von Büren (born 19 September 1822 in Bern - died 25 December 1888 in Bern) was a Swiss politician who served as the fourth mayor of Bern.

== Early life ==
Otto von Büren was born on 19 September 1822 in Bern to Albrecht Rudolf von Büren (1784-1856) and Margaretha Katharina Thormann (1790-1852), and baptized on 3 October 1822. He attended several private schools before pursuing further education at the university of Bern, where he studied Swiss history and law. Von Büren also studied in Neuchâtel and other places abroad, before he returned to Switzerland and became landowner of the Schosshalden estate, which was owned by his family. He married Henriette von Sinner in Bern.

== Political Career & Death ==
Von Büren first entered politics in 1849 and served on the Bern City Council until 1864. He was also a member of the Grand Council of the Canton of Bern from 1850 to 1888 and served on the National Council (lower house of the federal parliament) from 4 July 1864 to 30 November 1884. During his service on the Grand Council in 1866, von Büren became the leader of the conservative cantonal opposition and he was also the only member of the National Council to not be a part of the Radical Party (forerunner of today's Liberal Democratic Party). Von Büren opposed the (Kulturkampf) and was an opponent of the Poor Law, because he had always been in favor of private care for the poor. He stood against the Radical Party and maintained friendly contacts with leading Roman Catholic politicians from Switzerland and the envoys of the conservative monarchies. Von Büren held numerous positions within the Reformed Church of Switzerland and his faith was a guideline for his charitable actions.

Von Büren served as a Brigadier general in the Swiss army, and commanded of the 7th Infantry Brigade from 1875 to 1879 and the 6th Infantry Brigade from 1879 to 1882. On 8 September 1870, during the Franco-Prussian War, von Büren alongside Basel State Secretary Hieronymus Bischoff and Zurich Mayor Melchior Römer, travelled to the besieged French city of Strasbourg with the support of the Swiss Federal Council, in order to lead the Swiss aid organization in support of the people of the besieged city. They arrived at the Prussian headquarters on 15 September and managed to convince General August von Werder to allow their aid to the civilian population to continue. In the following weeks, the Swiss delegation successfully evacuated nearly 1,800 civilians from Strasbourg. Von Büren became Mayor (Gemeindepräsident) of Bern in 1864, building a new system of water and gas in the city during tenure. In 1871 the name of Gemeindepräsident was changed to Stadtpräsident. Von Büren died in office on Christmas Day 1888 in Bern at the age of 66.

== See also ==
- List of mayors of Bern

Preceded by Christoph Albert Kurz	Mayor of Bern, Switzerland; 1864–1888	Succeeded by Eduard Müller
