= Albert Ammann =

Swiss politician

Paul Albert Ammann (7 October 1860 – 4 June 1929) was a Swiss politician and President of the Swiss Council of States (1905/1906).

Preceded by Emil Isler	President of the Council of States; 1905/1906	Succeeded by Adalbert Wirz
