= List of mayors of Bern =

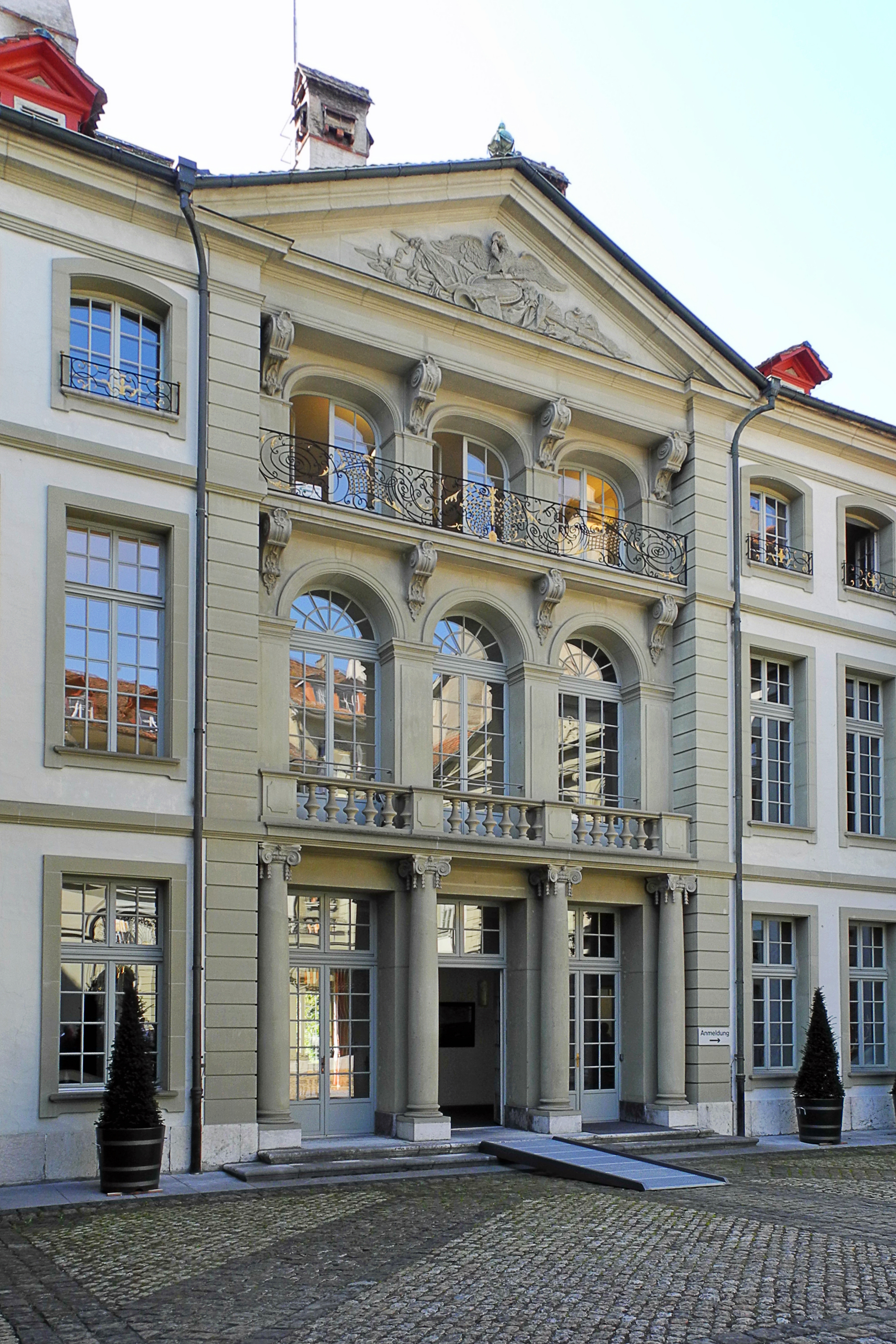
Erlacherhof Bern

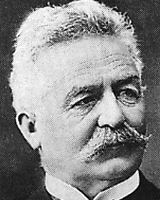
Eduard Müller mayor of Bern 1888–1895 member of the Federal Council 1895–1919

Coat of arms of Bern

This is a list of mayors of the city of Bern, Switzerland. The executive of Bern is the municipal council (Gemeinderat). It is chaired by the mayor (Stadtpräsident von Bern). From 1832 to 1871, the term Gemeindepräsident was used. Before 1832, the title of the mayor of Bern was Schultheiss.

Mayor of Bern
Term	Mayor	Lifespan	Party	Notes
1832–1848	Karl Zeerleder	(1780–1851)	Conservative	
1849–1863	Friedrich Ludwig von Effinger	(1795–1867)	Conservative	
1864	Christoph Albert Kurz	(1806–1864)	Conservative	
1864–1888	Otto von Büren	(1822–1888)	Conservative	Gemeindepräsident until 1871, Stadtpräsident since
1888–1895	Eduard Müller	(1848–1919)	FDP/PRL	
1895–1899	Franz Lindt	(1844–1901)	FDP/PRL	
1900–1918	Adolf von Steiger	(1859–1925)	FDP/PRL	
1918–1920	Gustav Müller	(1860–1921)	SPS/PSS	
1920–1937	Hermann Lindt	(1872–1937)	BGB/PAI	
1937–1951	Ernst Bärtschi	(1882–1976)	FDP/PRL	
1952–1958	Otto Steiger	(1890–1958)	BGB/PAI	
1958–1966	Eduard Freimüller	(1898–1966)	SPS/PSS	
1966–1979	Reynold Tschäppät	(1917–1979)	SPS/PSS	father of Alexander Tschäppät
1979–1992	Werner Bircher	(1928–2017)	FDP/PRL	
1993–2004	Klaus Baumgartner	(1937–2015)	SPS/PSS	
2005–2016	Alexander Tschäppät	(1952–2018)	SPS/PSS	son of Reynold Tschäppät
2017–2024	Alec von Graffenried	(born 1962)	Greens	
2025–present	Marieke Kruit	(born 1968)	SPS/PSS	

== See also ==
- Timeline of Bern

== Gallery ==
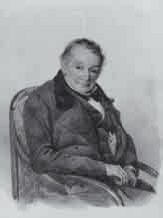
Karl Zeerleder
mayor 1832–1848

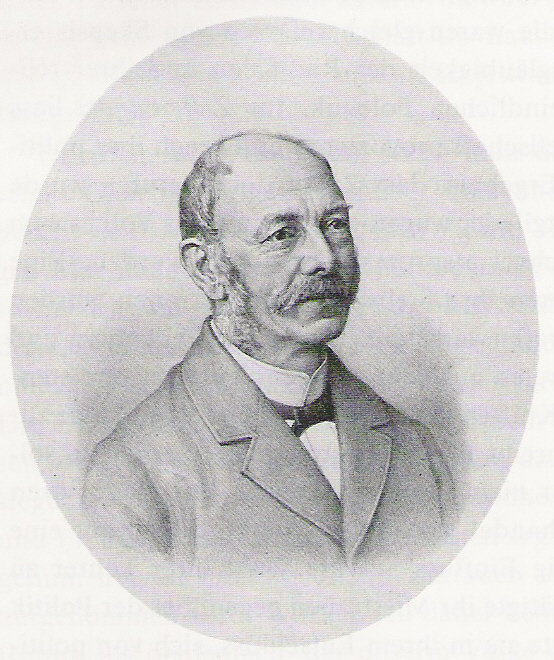
Otto von Büren
mayor 1864–1888

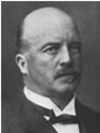
Adolf von Steiger
mayor 1900–1918

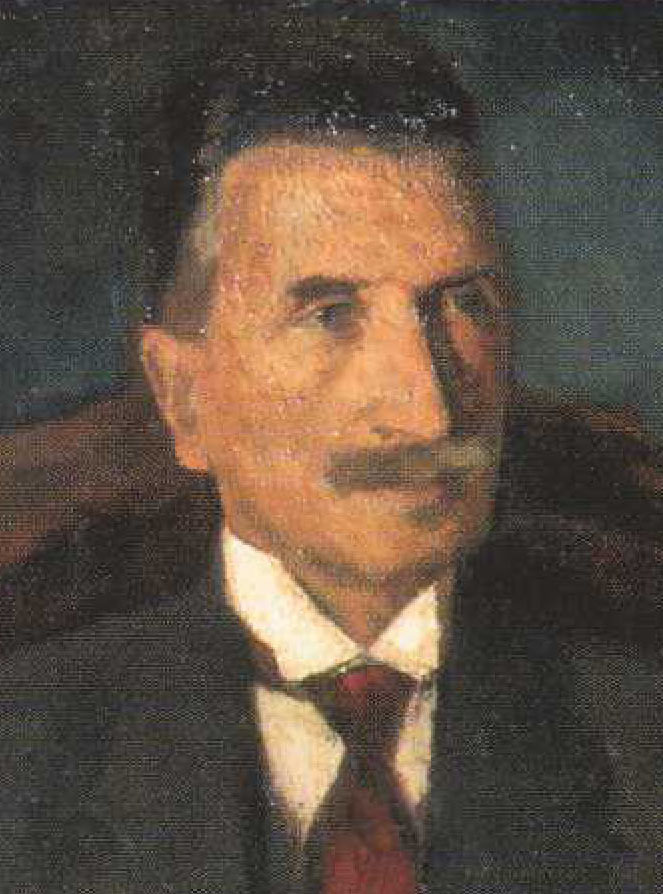
Gustav Müller
mayor 1918–1920
