= Christoph Albert Kurz =

Swiss politician

3rd Mayor of Bern
- In office 1864–1864
- Preceded by: Friedrich Ludwig von Effinger
- Succeeded by: Otto von Büren

Member of the Grand Council of Bern
- In office 1842–1864

Member of the Ständerat
- In office 1854–1864

Personal details
- Born: 22 March 1806 Bern, Switzerland
- Died: 3 April 1864 (aged 58) Bern, Switzerland
- Party: Conservative
- Education: Academy of Bern

Christoph Albert Kurz (born 22 March 1806 in Bern - died 3 April 1864 in Bern) was a Swiss politician who served as the third mayor of Bern.

== Personal life ==
Christoph Albert Kurz studied rights at the Bern Academy.

== Political career ==
He was working in Bern in 1832 as a lawyer. In 1838 he became a judge, but after the takeover of the Radical Party (forerunner of today's Liberal Democratic Party) in the canton of Bern in 1846, he was relieved of his duties.

He was a member of the Grand Council of Bern from 1842 to 1864 and was seven times president of the Grand Council. He had a part in the formation of the Bernese coalition government of conservatives and radicals in 1854. And he was a member of the Ständerat (first chamber of the federal parliament) from 1854 to 1864. He became the editor of the Zeitschrift für Vaterland Recht in 1858 and he made numerous publications.

Kurz was elected Mayor of Bern in 1864, but died in office the same year. He was the first Mayor of Bern to die in office.

== See also ==
- List of mayors of Bern

Preceded by Friedrich Ludwig von Effinger	Mayor of Bern, Switzerland; 1864	Succeeded by Otto von Büren
