= Hermann Lindt =

Swiss politician

9th Mayor of Bern
- In office 1920 – 21 October 1937
- Preceded by: Gustav Müller
- Succeeded by: Ernst Bärtschi

Member of the Council of Bern
- In office 1904–1909

Grand Council of the Canton of Bern
- In office 1909–1918

Grand Council of the Canton of Bern
- In office 1922–1937

Personal details
- Born: 9 February 1872 Bern, Switzerland
- Died: 21 October 1937 (aged 65) Bern, Switzerland
- Party: Conservative (former); People's Party
- Spouse: Sophie Diestel (m. 1920)

Otto Hermann Lindt (9 February 1872, in Bern – 21 October 1937, in Bern) was a Swiss politician who served as the ninth mayor of Bern.

== Personal life ==
Hermann Lindt studied law in Bern. He married Sophie Diestel in 1920.

== Political career ==
He worked as a lawyer in Bern from 1897 to 1920. In 1904 he was chosen member of the Council of Bern for the Conservative Party, he held this office until 1909. In that same year, he became alderman of Urban Construction (Baudirektor) and since 1920 alderman of Public Works (Tiefbaudirektor). He sat from 1909 to 1918 for the Conservative Party, and from 1922 to 1937 for the Party of Farmers, workers and shopkeepers (BGB, forerunner of today's Swiss People's Party) in the Grand Council of the Canton of Bern.

Hermann Lindt was chosen in 1920 as the successor to Mayor Gustav Müller of Bern. He died in office on 21 October 1937. Besides his work as a politician Hermann Lindt was also vice president and later chairman of the board of directors of the Bern Hypothekarkasse.

Preceded by Gustav Müller	Mayor of Bern, Switzerland; 1920–1937	Succeeded by Ernst Bärtschi
