= Franz Lindt =

Swiss politician (1844–1901)

6th Mayor of Bern
- In office 1895–1899
- Preceded by: Eduard Müller
- Succeeded by: Adolf von Steiger

Member of the Executive Council
- In office 1872–1894

Grand Council of the Canton of Bern
- In office 1894–1895

Personal details
- Born: 11 September 1844 Bern, Switzerland
- Died: 17 November 1901 (aged 57) Bern, Switzerland
- Party: Free Democrat
- Education: Federal Polytechnic Institute Zurich

Franz Lindt (11 September 1844 – 17 November 1901) was a Swiss politician who served as the sixth mayor of Bern.

== Personal life ==
Lindt graduated from the Federal Polytechnic Institute in Zürich.

== Career ==
Lindt began his career as an assistant to the cantonal geodesist Franz Rudolf Jakob Rohr. When Rohr was elected to the Executive Council in 1872, Lindt succeeded him as the cantonal geodesist.

In 1894, he was elected to the Grand Council of Bern, where he took over the building department.

Lindt succeeded Eduard Müller as the mayor of Bern when Müller was elected into the Federal Council in 1895. In 1899, he resigned because of a neurological disorder leaving him incapable to fulfill his duties.

== See also ==
- List of mayors of Bern

Preceded by Eduard Müller	Mayor of Bern, Switzerland; 1895–1899	Succeeded by Adolf von Steiger
