= Emil Isler =

Swiss politician (1851–1936)

Peter Emil Isler (31 January 1851 – 10 March 1936) was a Swiss politician and President of the Swiss Council of States (1904/1905).

Preceded by Adrien Lachenal	President of the Council of States; 1904/1905	Succeeded by Albert Ammann
