= Klaus Baumgartner =

Swiss politician

Klaus Baumgartner (21 December 1937 – 10 December 2015) was a Swiss politician.

== Biography ==
After Baumgartner finished school, he received a doctorate in economic and social sciences. From 1974 to 1988, he was on the Directorate Secretary on the Swiss Federal Office for Housing. From 1977 to 1988, he was a representative of the Social Democratic Party member of the Bern City Council; In 1987, he was a town councilor. He was elected to the Bernese council in 1989 and worked there until 1992 as a welfare and health director. From 1993 to 2004, he was Mayor of Bern. He was succeeded by Alexander Tschäppät.
