= Adalbert Wirz =

Swiss politician (1848–1925)

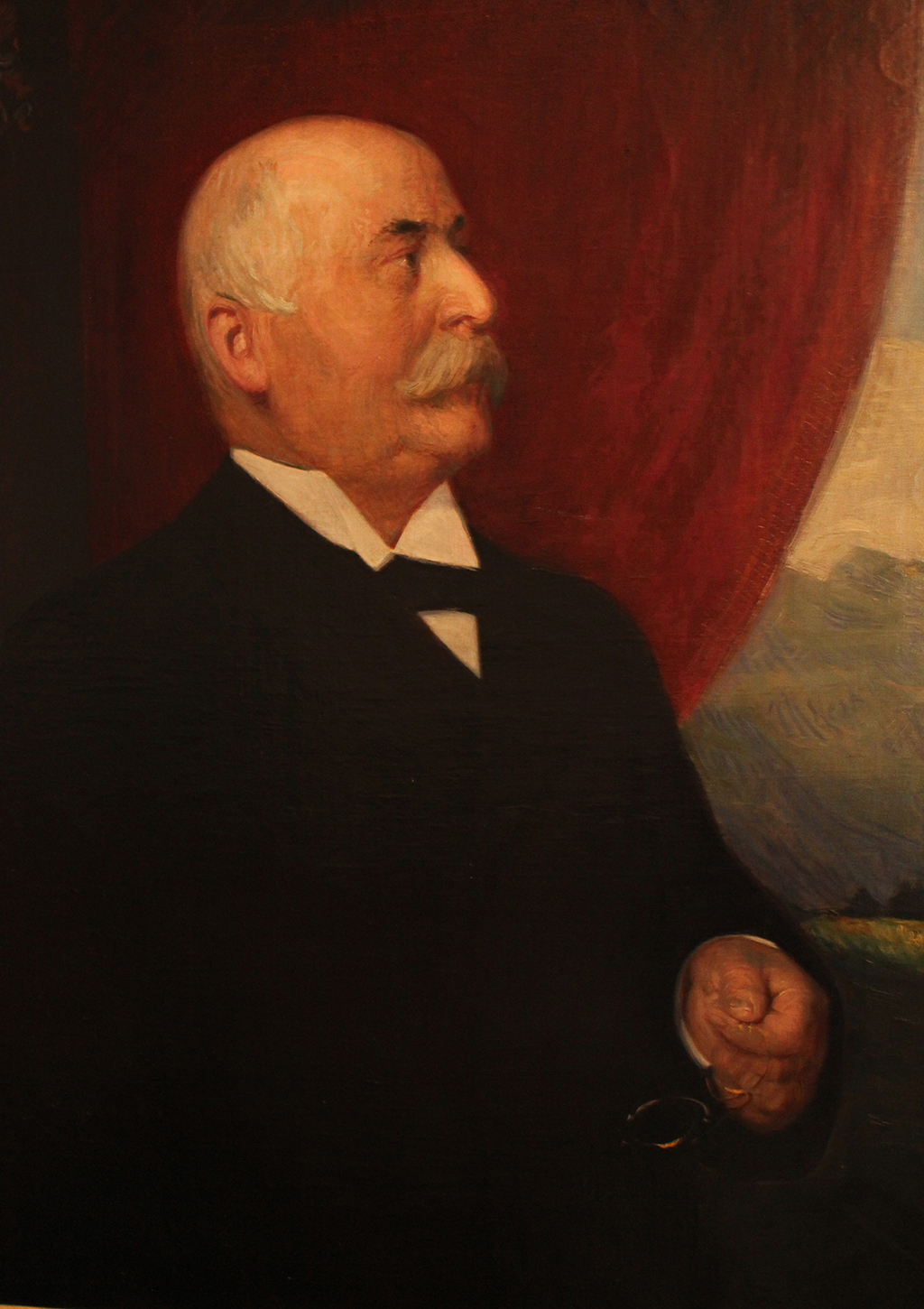
Adalbert Wirz undated portrait

Adalbert Wirz (16 June 1848, Sarnen – 14 September 1925) was a Swiss politician who served as president of the Swiss Council of States (1906/1907).

Preceded by Albert Ammann	President of the Council of States; 1906/1907	Succeeded by Paul Scherrer
