= Paul Scherrer (politician) =

Swiss politician

Paul Scherrer (20 April 1862 – 10 March 1935) was a Swiss politician and President of the Swiss Council of States (1907/1908).

Preceded by Adalbert Wirz	President of the Council of States; 1907/1908	Succeeded by Adrien Thélin
