= Adrien Lachenal =

Swiss politician and Jurist

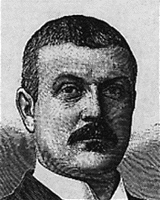
Adrien Lachenal

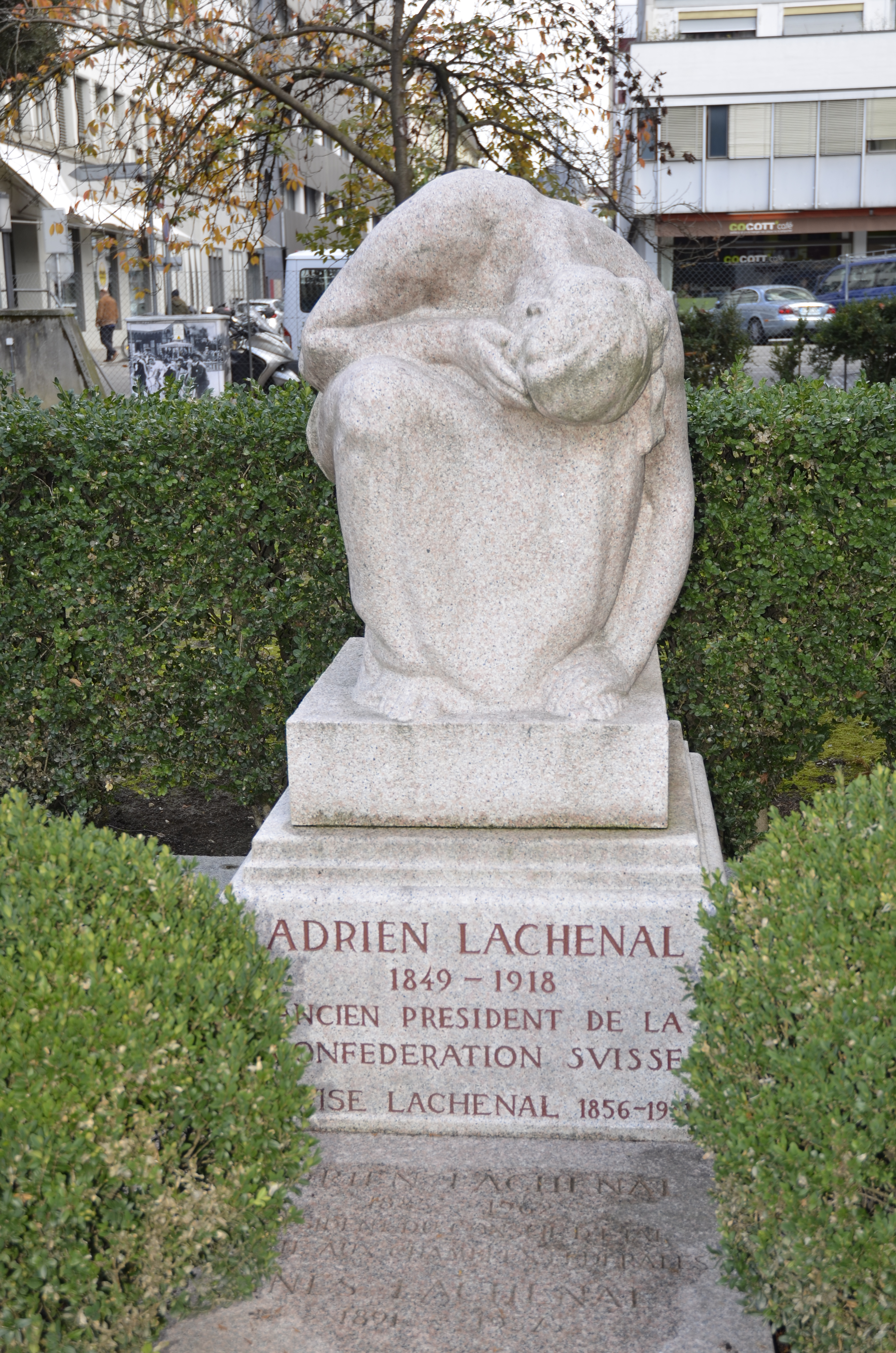
Tomb of Adrien Lachenal, Cimetière des Rois, Geneva.

Adrien Lachenal (19 May 1849 in Geneva – 29 June 1918) was a Swiss politician and Jurist. He was president of the Swiss Confederation in 1896.

Married to Anne Louise Eggly in 1878, he had four sons. He was affiliated to the Free Democratic Party. He was a Freemason, and belonged to the Masonic lodge "Fidélité et Prudence" in Geneva. Lachenal is buried at the Cimetière des Rois, Geneva.

== Career and politics ==
Adrien Lachenal was an outstanding speaker and lawyer, and he became known through defensive mandates in awe-inspiring trials. From 1885 to 1892 he was a substitute judge at the canton of Geneva. His military career led him to the rank of lieutenant-colonel. His nephew and later President of the Grand Council Paul Lachenal joined him in his lawfirm. He was also the chairman of the Military Court of Cassation. In 1880 Lachenal was elected to the Grand Council (Grand Conseil), to which he belonged until 1892. Soon he was one of the most influential politicians of the radical faction. Over time, he turned to a policy of reconciliation. His commitment to social policy finally led to the formation of an alliance with the socialists. In 1881, the Grand Council elected Lachenal into the Council of States. there he spoke in particular on topics such as military, customs and finance. After the parliamentary elections in 1884, he moved to the National Council where he was the President in 1885 and 1891.

He was elected to the Federal Council of Switzerland on 15 December 1892 and handed over office on 31 December 1899. In 1896 he was elected President of the Swiss Confederation.

During his time in office he held the following departments:

- Department of Foreign Affairs (1893–1895)
- Political Department as President of the Confederation (1896)
- Department of Trade, Industry and Agriculture (1897)
- Department of Home Affairs (1898–1899)

Rue Adrien-Lachenal in Geneva and Avenue Adrien-Lachenal in Versoix are named after him.

== See also ==
- Plainpalais

Political offices
Preceded by Eduard Müller	President of the National Council; 1891/1892	Succeeded by Albert Brosi
Preceded by Numa Droz	Member of the Swiss Federal Council; 1892–1899	Succeeded by Robert Comtesse
Preceded by Arthur Hoffmann	President of the Swiss Council of States; 1903/1904	Succeeded by Emil Isler
