= Paul Lachenal =

Swiss politician and philanthropist

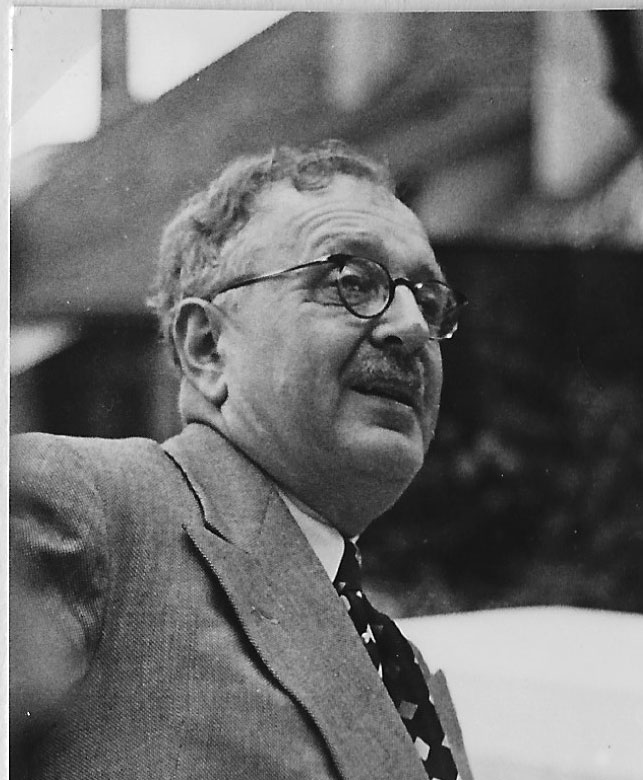
Paul Lachenal

Paul Lachenal (1884, Geneva – 1955) was a Swiss politician and philanthropist.

He was born in Geneva as son of the Jean-François Lachenal and the Louise Marie born Gleckner. He studied law at the University of Geneva, which he completed in 1906 with the acquisition of the licentiate (lic. Iur.). As a result, he completed an internship at the law firm of his uncle (the president of the Confederation) Adrien Lachenal. From 1908 to 1911 he served as deputy to the Geneva prosecutor, and finally from 1912 as General attorney. 1907 he founded together with Eugène Borel (1862 -1955), the law firm Borel & Barbey.

Paul Lachenal, who was married to Elisabeth Alice Lachenal Jenny, died on 10 March 1955, four months after his 70th birthday in Geneva. He was the father of, Ariane Garbade Lachenal and Editor and diplomat François Lachenal, and grandfather of the artist Daniel Garbade.

== Politics ==
The political career of Paul Lachenal, began as member of the Liberation Democratic Party in 1914, and his election to the Geneva City Council, to which belonged till 1922. He represented his party at the cantonal level from 1916 to 1930 and 1936 to 1945 in the Geneva Grand Council, which he presided in 1924, and from 1930 to 1936 as head of the educational department in the State Council.

In 1927, he was appointed president of the German-Polish Mixed Arbitral Tribunal by the Council of the League of Nations, a position which he holds for several years, until the close of the court's operations.

== Philanthropist ==
Lachenal was a lover of music and the arts, he co-founded and presided the prestigious Orchestre de la Suisse Romande, and the Pro Helvetia Culture Foundation, which he presided from 1940 to 1952. At the end of the 1930s, he presided the foundation: Friends of the Museum of Art and History of Geneva. As a member and delegate of the International Committee for the Safeguarding of Spanish Art Treasures, created in January 1939, he played an important role in the safeguard operation of the Prado museum, during the Spanish Civil War, which paintings found refuge in Geneva. 174 of these paintings were exhibited in the halls of the Musée d'Art et d'Histoire (Geneva) in June, July and August 1939. The exhibition attracted more than 400'000 visitors. Paul Lachenal was the lawyer of Pablo Picasso, and godfather of his son Paul whom he sheltered during the Second World War in Geneva, Switzerland.
