= Bertles =

Bertles is an English surname. Notable people with the surname include:

- Bob Bertles (1939–2024), Australian jazz musician and bandleader
- Zoe Emma Bertles (1880–1975), Australian librarian
