= Zoe Emma Bertles =

Australian librarian (1880–1975)

- Born: May 8, 1880; West Maitland, New South Wales, Australia
- Died: February 27, 1975 (aged 94); Mosman, Australia
- Education: University of Sydney
- Occupation: Librarian
- Employer: Public Library of New South Wales

Zoe Emma Bertles (May 8, 1880 – February 27, 1975) was an Australian librarian. She had a leading career at the Public Library of New South Wales.

== Life ==
Bertles was born in 1880 in West Maitland, New South Wales. Her parents were the Australian-born Emma Cecilia (born Evans) and Samuel Bertles, who was an English immigrant builder. She ran a small school in Quirindi after she attended the local Maitland Girls' High School until 1912. In that year, she before studying at the University of Sydney, while still continuing to teach part-time.

In 1915, she began her career as a librarian at the Public Library of New South Wales, where she became a library assistant. It has been suggested that the leading librarian Nita Kibble was involved in her appointment. In 1917, Bertles was a researcher and two years later she called a cataloguer. The principal librarian, William Herbert Ifould, said she was one of his best.

In 1920 she was promoted over the heads of longer-served colleagues to lead the country circulation department. The department was transformed during her tenure and this was noticed by users, inspectors and politicians. She managed despite poor office facilities and in time she enjoyed purpose-built buildings.

Bertles was a strong contender to be the Mitchell Librarian, but she lacked her fellow librarian, Ida Leeson's, knowledge of Australiana. Leeson was appointed to be the Mitchell librarian in December 1932 to replace the first Mitchell Librarian Hugh Wright.

Ralph Munn and Ernest R. Pitt wrote a report in 1935 that included their judgement that her country service had more than proved its value. In 1938, the Australian Institute of Librarians held its first conference and Bertles reported that use of her department had tripled. She was to lead the country circulation department for 25 years.

In 1939, the Business and Professional Women's Club of Sydney was founded and Bertles was a founding member. In 1942, she was identified as the service's first Chief Cataloguer. In 1946 when she retired she had been the Library Board of New South Wales' senior technical officer for about two years.

Bertles died aged 94 in Mosman in 1975. The National Library of Australia has a collection of thousands of newspaper cuttings and some of these involve Bertles.
