= Maitland Grossmann High School =

Location
- East Maitland, New South Wales; Australia
- Coordinates: 32°44′39″S 151°35′29″E

Information
- Type: Government-funded co-educational comprehensive secondary day school
- Motto: Latin: Labor Omnia Vincit (Work Conquers All)
- Established: 28 January 1884; 141 years ago (as Maitland Girls' High School)
- Educational authority: New South Wales Department of Education
- Principal: Neil Fara
- Teaching staff: 83.4 FTE (2018)
- Years: 7–12
- Enrolment: 1,196 (2018)
- Campus type: Suburban
- Houses: Brewster; Campbell; Grossmann; Watson
- Colours: Navy blue and white
- Website: maitgross-h.schools.nsw.gov.au

Maitland Grossmann High School (abbreviated as MGHS) is a government-funded co-educational comprehensive secondary day school, located in East Maitland, New South Wales, Australia. The school is situated on Cumberland Street, adjacent to the old Maitland Gaol.

Established in 1884 as the girls only single-sex Maitland Girls' High School, in 1986 the school collaborated with Maitland Boys High, and now both schools are co-educational, with Maitland Girls' High School renamed as Maitland Grossmann High School, and Maitland Boys' High School renamed as Maitland High School. Maitland Grossmann High School enrolled approximately 1,200 students in 2018, from Year 7 to Year 12, of whom seven percent identified as Indigenous Australians and six percent were from a language background other than English. The school is operated by the NSW Department of Education.

The school draws it name from Jeanette Grossman, who provided accommodation for the school in its early years.

== Academic results ==
Maitland Grossmann excels in many areas of study, and is one of the most successful schools in the Hunter Valley. The school has a reputation in the Maitland community in the following areas: academic achievement; quality creative and performing arts; excellence in sport; caring student welfare; and highly effective behaviour management strategies.

In 2012, Maitland Grossmann High School celebrated its best NSW Higher School Certificate (HSC) results in recent years, being placed 211th in New South Wales and second in Newcastle/Central Coast for comprehensive high schools based on Band 6 results.

In 2017, Maitland Grossmann High School celebrated a student achieve first in the state for Visual Arts. This student was the first ever to come from a public, non-selective high school since the establishment of the HSC.

== Sports ==
The school currently holds the cross country regional combined high schools trophy. The school also contains the swimming and athletics zone trophies, and has for many years running.

== Alumni ==
- Zoe Emma Bertles (1880–1975), became a leading librarian.
- Lorna Byrne (1897–1989), radio broadcaster
- Cheryl Kernot (1948–), politician

== Former staff ==
- Anna Marie Hlawaczek (1849–1893), second headmistress and explorer

== See also ==
- List of government schools in New South Wales
- Education in Australia
