= Anna Marie Hlawaczek =

Australian high school teacher

Anna Marie Hlawaczek (1849–1893), was an Austrian governess, teacher, school principal, world traveller and explorer. She was the second headmistress of Maitland Girls' High School, Maitland, New South Wales, Australia.

== Biography ==
Anna Hlawaczek was born in Vienna, Austria, on 19 March 1849. She attended school in the Viennese suburb of Mariahilf for five years, followed by six years at the Music Conservatoire Polyhymnia in Vienna where she was, according to one newspaper report, one of the most talented students. She spoke at least four languages: German, French, Italian and English.

In 1866, she became a governess, and worked for a number of high-ranking families in Hungary until 1877 "with occasional vacations spent in travelling". In 1867-69 she was governess to the Kethely Family, and from 1869 to 1872, she was governess to the family of Herzog, Secretary to Count Gyula Andrássy (Prime Minister of Hungary, 1867–1871). She then spent four years in French Algeria teaching, including private piano instruction. In 1878, she left Algiers for Rio de Janeiro carrying a letter of recommendation from Robert Playfair, British Consul General in Algiers. Playfair wrote that Anna Marie was "a brave little woman" and that he would "esteem it a favour if you can give her whatever advice and protection she may require". Perhaps attracted to the Antipodes by the Sydney International Exhibition to be held in 1879, Anna Marie then headed to Australia. She arrived in Melbourne, Victoria, where she obtained a recommendation from the Swiss Consul. By 1881 she was in Sydney where she was known as "Fraulein Hlawaczek", teacher of German and Music, at Shirley College for Young Ladies. Anna Hlawaczek then travelled to New Zealand (NZ) where from June 1882 to March 1883, she was an Assistant Teacher at the Auckland Girls' High School. After a brief trip back to Vienna on family business, she returned to Australia. In 1884 she applied to the NSW Department of Public Instruction for a teaching post and won the position as the second "Head Mistress" of one of the four new girls' public high schools at Maitland, NSW.

As principal, Anna Hlawaczek conducted the entrance examinations, collected the school fees, and administered the scholarships. She taught all classes in English, Mathematics, History, Geography, French, Latin, with the help of two teachers from local schools who came in once a week to teach sewing and art. However, as the inaugural principal Mary Augusta Olsen had found, the school building was makeshift and inadequate. Anna Marie's health declined, and she suffered from insomnia and nervousness. By November 1886, Anna Hlawaczek asked to be moved, or she would resign from the Department. The Chief Inspector, John Charles Maynard (1835 – 1906), thought her temperament "peculiar" and unsuited to work in public schools. Anna Hlawaczek left the Department and for a short time, taught music and singing in Sydney. As a parting shot she gave a damning review on the problems she perceived in public school system in NSW to the Evening News, (Note: The Evening News was a popular Australian (Sydney) daily newspaper founded by Samuel Bennett in 1867 and closed in 1931.) and left soon after, finding her way eventually to South Africa as a governess.

Anna Marie Hlawaczek was an example of the New Woman, educated and free spirited as the final chapter of her life demonstrated. Inspired by other women explorers at the time, especially after reading of the exploits of May French Sheldon, in 1892 she decided to walk the African continent from Cape Town to Cairo. In the end, she succeeded in walking over 3,000 kilometres before she died from some sort of fever at Fort Anderson in the Mulanje District of British Central Africa in September 1893, aged 44. The registration of her death in British colonial records describes her rank or profession as 'Explorer'. Her death was noted by a young colonial Englishman, Edward Laidlaw Thomson, who wrote to his mother that Anna Hlawaczek's death was a very sad thing and that he thought she was "very ladylike and accomplished". Throughout 1894 and 1895, her death was widely reported in English language and Austrian newspapers.
