= Ida Leeson =

Australian librarian

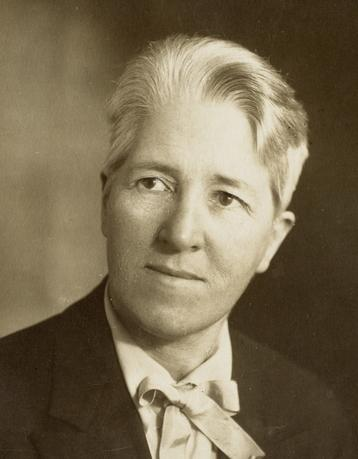
- Leeson at the wedding reception of Paquita Crouch in 1933
- Born: Ida Emily Leeson; 11 February 1885; Leichhardt, New South Wales, Australia
- Died: 22 January 1964 (aged 78); Castlecrag, New South Wales, Australia
- Education: University of Sydney
- Occupation: Librarian
- Known for: Mitchell Librarian

Ida Emily Leeson (11 February 1885 – 22 January 1964) was the Mitchell Librarian at the State Library of New South Wales from December 1932 – April 1946. She was the first woman to achieve a senior management position in an Australian library.

== Early years ==
Ida Emily Leeson was born in Leichhardt, New South Wales, Australia, on 11 February 1885, daughter of Thomas Leeson, a carpenter from Canada, and his Australian-born wife Mary Ann, née Emberson. She was educated at Leichhardt Public School and Sydney Girls High School, where she was a successful student, winning first prize in the first class in 1900. Leeson graduated from the University of Sydney in 1906.

== Career ==
Leeson began her working career briefly as a teacher, before taking up a position at the Public Library of New South Wales as a library assistant in 1906. She transferred to a position in the Mitchell Library in 1909, where she processed the collection of Australiana bequeathed to the library by David Scott Mitchell. "Leeson's interest in Australian and Pacific materials grew as she worked up the ranks at the Mitchell Library, eventually landing the senior position of principal accessions officer in 1919." In this role, Leeson was among the most senior staff at the library ranking behind William Ifould, Wright and Nita Kibble. She was a significant influence on the history of the Mitchell Library and was the first woman to achieve a senior management position in an Australian library.

Lesson started out as a cataloger, learning French, Dutch, German, Spanish, and Italian in order to catalog the massive number of Australian and Pacific materials in the collections. She then became an acquisitions and collection management librarian in order to build and maintain these collections.

=== Mitchell Librarian ===
Leeson worked with the Mitchell Library collection in its first ten years. Zoe Emma Bertles was a strong contender to be Mitchell Librarian, but she lacked Leeson's wide knowledge of Australiana. Leeson was appointed to the senior role of Mitchell Librarian in December 1932 and administered it until 1944. Her appointment to this role was noted by the National Council of Women in a letter of protest to the Sydney Morning Herald as being accompanied by the creation of a new, and more senior, Deputy Principal Librarian role, awarded to John Metcalfe, a man. Previously the post of Mitchell Librarian had been seen as the de facto successor to the Principal Librarian. Senior roles for women in Australian libraries continued to be debated and Leeson attended a conference of the Australian Institute of Librarians in 1939 where this was discussed.

With the development of microfilming technology, Leeson was to oversee the copying of thousands of records relating to the history of Australia that were held in archives and libraries around the world. However, this project was interrupted due to the outbreak of the Second World War.

During the sesqui-centenary celebrations in 1938 (150 years since the foundation of British settlement in Australia), Leeson was published in the Sydney Morning Herald describing the resources available in the collections at the Mitchell Library. Leeson's role as the Mitchell Librarian was referenced by poet James McAuley in his poem The true discovery of Australia.

=== Army ===
In 1944, Leeson joined the Australian Army. She held several positions, first as a research officer, then as captain, and finally as major. She was a key member of Lieutenant-Colonel A. A. Conlon's 'think-tank', Directorate of Research and Civil Affairs, which included such people as (Sir) John Kerr and J. K. Murray.

After the war Leeson worked for two other important bodies: the Australian School of Pacific Administration and the South Pacific Commission. In 1949, she went to Nouméa to establish the library for the South Pacific Commission, returning to Australia in 1950, where she continued to work for the commission in Sydney until 1956.

=== Activism ===
Leeson had a long history of fighting for the rights of library employees. Her first act as a library assistant was to sign a petition for equitable pay for working on Sundays. She then became a member of the librarians' union. In the 1930s, Leeson supported the anti-fascist movement. During the same time, she joined the movement of Theosophy in Castlecrag, where women advocated for their rights through creative works such as plays and literature.

== Personal life ==
Leeson was in a committed lesbian relationship for 50 years with a New Zealand woman named Florence Birch. Leeson's family destroyed all papers related to her relationship with Birch after her death.

== Awards ==
Leeson was awarded the King George V's Silver Jubilee Medal in 1935.

She died aged 78, on 22 January 1964 at Castlecrag.

== See also ==
- Jean Arnot
- Phyllis Mander-Jones
