= Nita Kibble =

Australian librarian

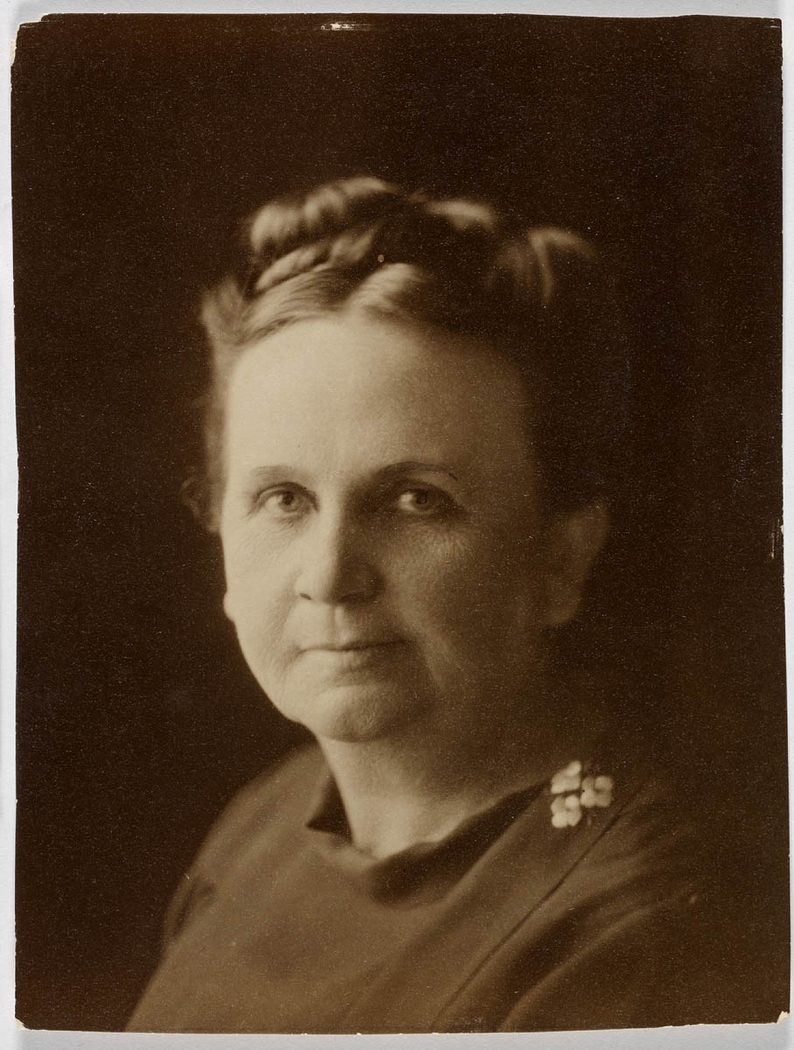
- Nita B. Kibble in 1927
- Born: Nita Bernice Kibble; 8 June 1879; Denman, New South Wales
- Died: 4 February 1962 (aged 82)
- Occupation: Librarian at State Library of New South Wales
- Parent(s): George Augustus Frederick Kibble; Eliza Kibble, née McDermott

Nita Kibble (1879–1962) was the first woman to be a librarian with the State Library of New South Wales. She held the position of Principal Research Librarian from 1919 until her retirement in 1943. Kibble was a founding member of the Australian Institute of Librarians. The Nita B. Kibble Literary Awards (the Kibble Awards) for Australian women writers are named in her honour.

== Early life ==
Nita Bernice Kibble was born on 8 June 1879 at Denman, New South Wales, the younger daughter of George Augustus Frederick Kibble, Scottish postmaster, and his wife Eliza, née McDermott. Kibble was educated at Denman Public School and St Vincent's College, Potts Point, Sydney.

== Career ==
The first female librarian to be appointed to the State Library of New South Wales, Kibble began her career at the library on probation as a junior attendant in the lending branch on 29 November 1899.

In an era when women in Australia did not often receive equal pay for equal work and were excluded from some professional opportunities, the library offered a career path for women. H.C.L. Anderson recruited educated women to work as reading room attendants and from there they could progress into the clerical and professional divisions of the Public Service Board. Kibble progressed through the ranks and passed the Public Service Board examinations, eventually establishing the Library's first research department in 1918. Kibble was described by Mr Ifould, the State Librarian as "a fine example of patience, imagination and wide knowledge combined."

Kibble studied courses at the University of Sydney in economics, philosophy, psychology and sociology which equipped her for her work in the Research Department. In 1919 she was appointed Principal Research Officer, and retained the position until her retirement in 1943. She was a foundation member of the Australian Institute of Librarians and a staunch advocate for the recognition of the profession. Kibble's papers are held in the collection of the State Library of New South Wales.

== Awards and memorials ==
Kibble raised her niece, Nita May Dobbie, from birth. In her will, Dobbie established the Nita B Kibble Literary Awards for Women Writers which recognise the work of Australian female writers in memory of her aunt. "The Awards recognise the works of women writers of fiction or non-fiction classified as 'life writing'. This includes novels, autobiographies, biographies, literature and any writing with a strong personal element."

There are two components to the awards:

- The Kibble Literary Award recognises the work of an established Australian woman writer
- The Dobbie Literary Award recognises a first published work from an Australian woman writer.

== See also ==
- Ida Leeson
- Jean Arnot
- William Herbert Ifould
