= State Library of New South Wales =

Central library for the state of New South Wales, Australia

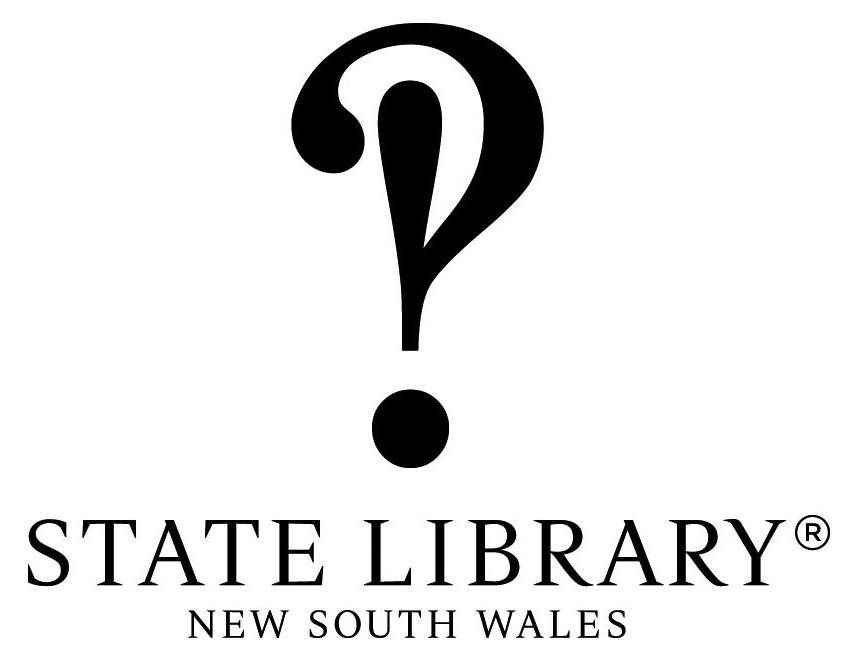

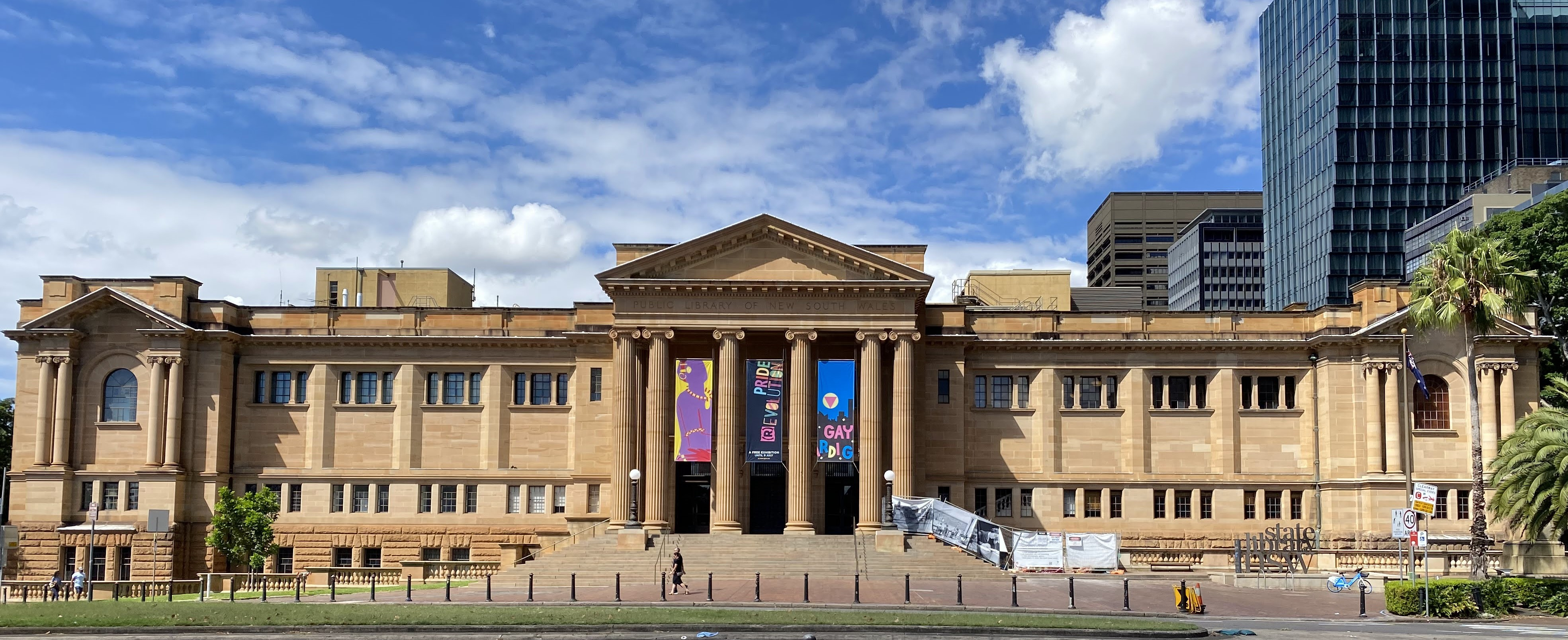
- State Library of New South Wales, Mitchell Building, in 2023
- 33°51′59″S 151°12′48″E
- Location: Macquarie Street and 1 Shakespeare Place, Sydney central business district, City of Sydney, New South Wales, Australia
- Type: State Library^{[note 1]}
- Established: 1826; 200 years ago
- Reference to legal mandate: Library Act 1939

Collection
- Size: 5 million items (5,000,000)
- Legal deposit: Since 1879

Other information
- Budget: A$91.7 million
- Director: Dr Caroline Butler-Bowdon (State Librarian)
- Website: www.sl.nsw.gov.au

History
- Built: 1905–1910

Site notes
- Architects: Walter Liberty Vernon; Richard Macdonald Seymour Wells; Alan Robertson; H.C.L. Anderson

New South Wales Heritage Register
- Official name: State Library of NSW; Mitchell Library
- Type: State heritage (built)
- Designated: 2 April 1999
- Reference no.: 1071
- Type: Library
- Category: Education
- Builders: Howie Bros (1939); FWC Powell & Sons (1959); Mellocco Bros (1964)

The State Library of New South Wales, part of which is known as the Mitchell Library, is a large heritage-listed special collections, reference and research library open to the public and is one of the oldest libraries in Australia. Established in 1869 its collections date back to the Australian Subscription Library established in the colony of New South Wales (now a state of Australia) in 1826. The library is located on the corner of Macquarie Street and Shakespeare Place, in the Sydney central business district adjacent to the Domain and the Royal Botanic Gardens, in the City of Sydney. The library is a member of the National and State Libraries Australia (NSLA) consortium.

The Mitchell Wing of the State Library of New South Wales building was designed by Walter Liberty Vernon, assisted by H. C. L. Anderson and was built from 1905 to 1910, with further additions by Howie Bros in 1939; by FWC Powell & Sons in 1959; and by Melocco Bros in 1964. The property was added to the New South Wales State Heritage Register on 2 April 1999. Work began on the Macquarie Street Wing in 1983 and it was opened in 1988.

== Collection ==
The State Reference Library contains a comprehensive and diverse collection of Australian and international research material. The collections grow through purchase, donation, transfer and legal deposit for all books published in New South Wales. A number of specialist services are located within the State Reference Library, including the legal information service established in 1990, a drug and alcohol information service and a family history research service.

The library contains over 6 million items including more than 2 million books, 1.2 million microforms, 2 million photographs, as well as newspapers, maps, architectural plans, manuscripts and other items. It is part of the PANDORA web archiving project of the National Library of Australia and also collects born digital material.

As well as being a general purpose reference and research library, it contains many historically significant collections including material dating from the European colonisation of Australia. These are held in the Australiana research collections known as the Mitchell Library (named for David Scott Mitchell, first collector of Australiana) and the Dixson Library (named after Sir William Dixson).

=== Collection highlights ===
The library has been continuously adding to its collections since 1826 and holds collections of manuscripts, books, artworks, photography and artefacts of national and international significance. These include:

- Original Log of the Proceedings of HMS Bounty in a Voyage to the South Seas, William Bligh, 1 December 1787 – 22 October 1788, Safe 1/46.
- Journal kept by Joseph Banks on board HMS Endeavour during the first voyage undertaken by James Cook to the Pacific Ocean.
- Harold Lasseter's diary documenting his expedition in 1930 searching for gold.
- George Augustus Robinson's journal from 1832 recording his activities in Tasmania, notable for the detailed information he recorded about the local Aboriginal people he encountered.
- The Holtermann Collection of over 3,500 glass-plate negatives and albumen prints, many of which depict life in New South Wales goldfield towns between 1871 and 1876.
- Max Dupain and Associates archive of 250,000 negatives, transparencies, and photographs 1905–2011.
- Richardson Collection of 289 volumes of rare bibles, religious works, early printed books and a small collection of medieval manuscripts.
- First Fleet Journals. The Library holds the most comprehensive collection of First Fleet journals in the world; of the fifteen journals known to survive, ten are held in the State Library's collections.
- Shakespeare Folios. The Library holds a copy of the extremely rare 1623 "First Folio" as well as copies of the "Second", "Third" and "Fourth" folios.
- World War One Collection. The Library holds a rich and significant collection of personal diaries and letters written by those who served in the First World War.
- Indigenous Languages Collection. These records are vocabularies and other language material from Aboriginal and Torres Strait Islander peoples and date from 1788 to the 1930s.
- George Morrison Collection. A comprehensive collection of the personal papers of 'Morrison of Peking' that documents a volatile time in world history and is of international significance.
- Australian Antarctic Expedition (1911–1914) photographs, notes, and reports. Includes over 2000 photographic negatives taken on the expedition.
- Frank Hurley's Antarctic colour plates of Shackleton's Endurance expedition as well as his colour Paget plates from World War One.
- The Social Media Archive is the Library's Digital Collecting Strategy partnership with CSIRO Data 61 to collect and archive publicly-available social media.
- Sir William Dixson numismatic collection of over 7800 coins, notes and tokens.
- Two of three surviving copies of the New South Wales General Standing Orders, the first book published in Australia.
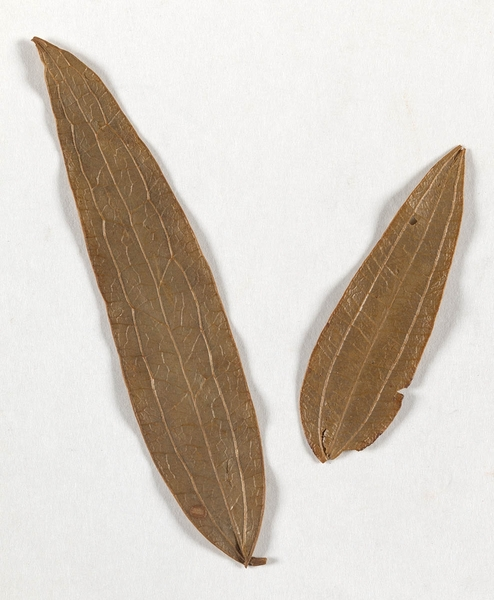
Leaves from Botany Bay used as tea by Mary Bryant
(1791)

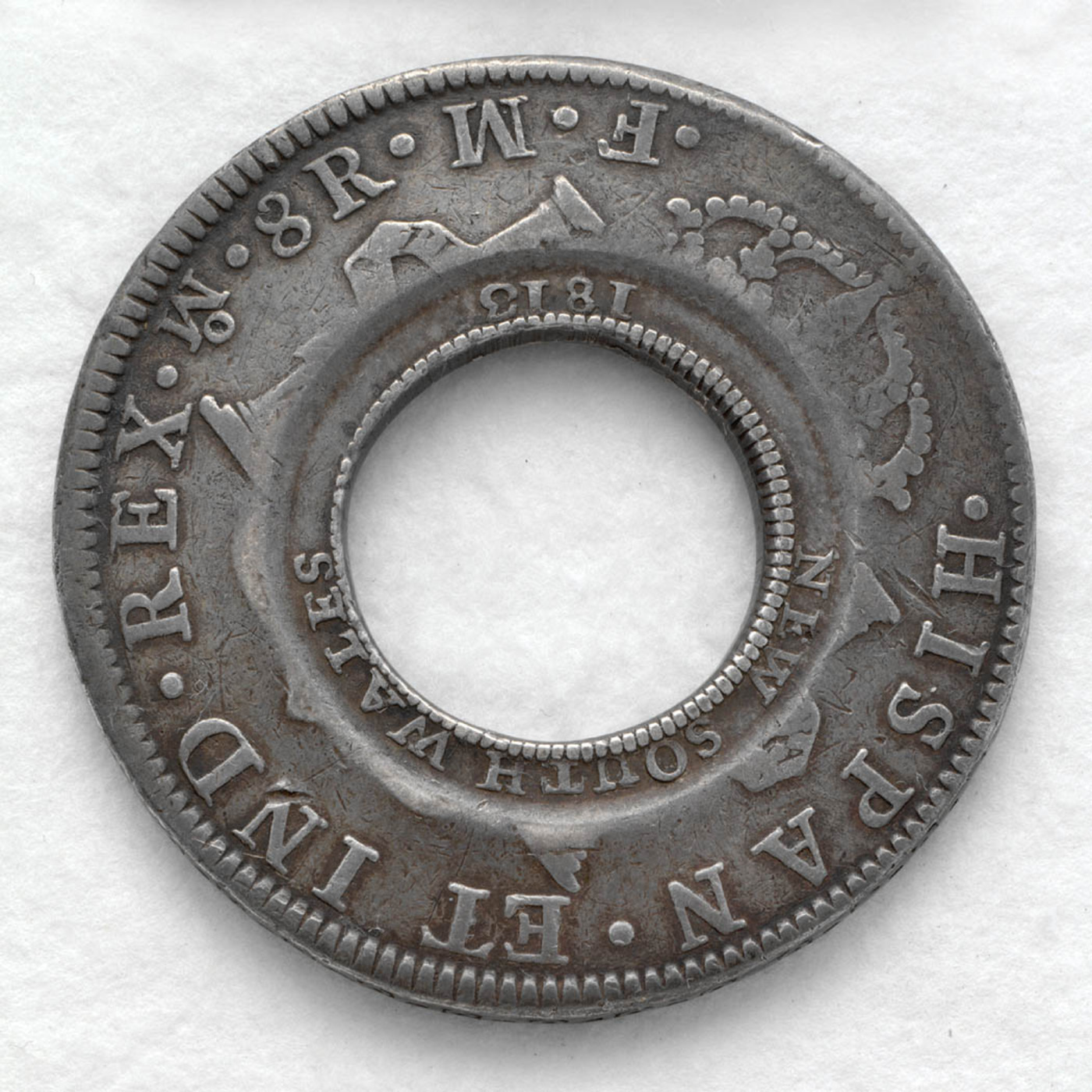
Holey dollar and dump first distinct NSW coinage
(1813)

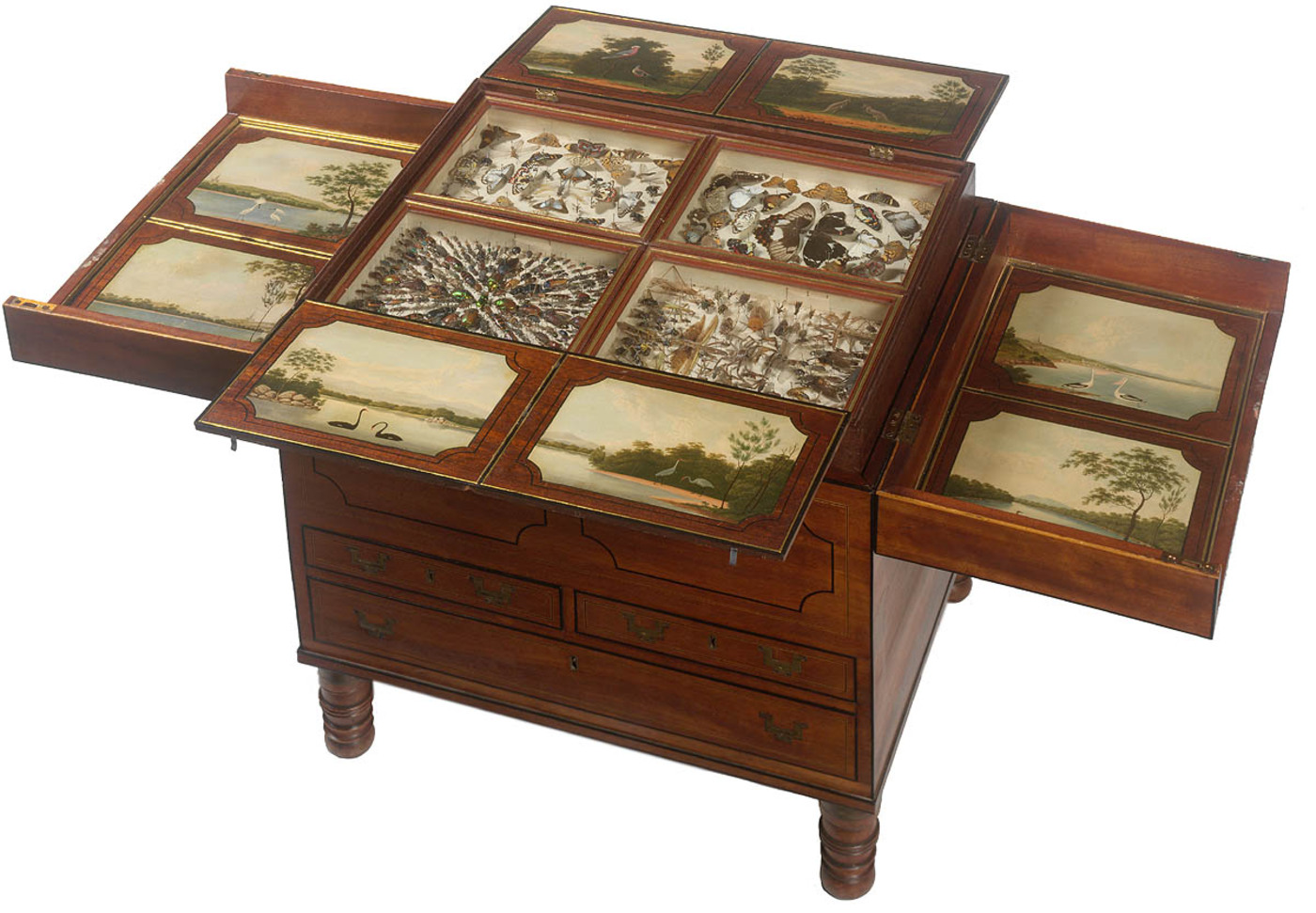
Macquarie collector's chest, constructed by Captain James Wallis
(1818)

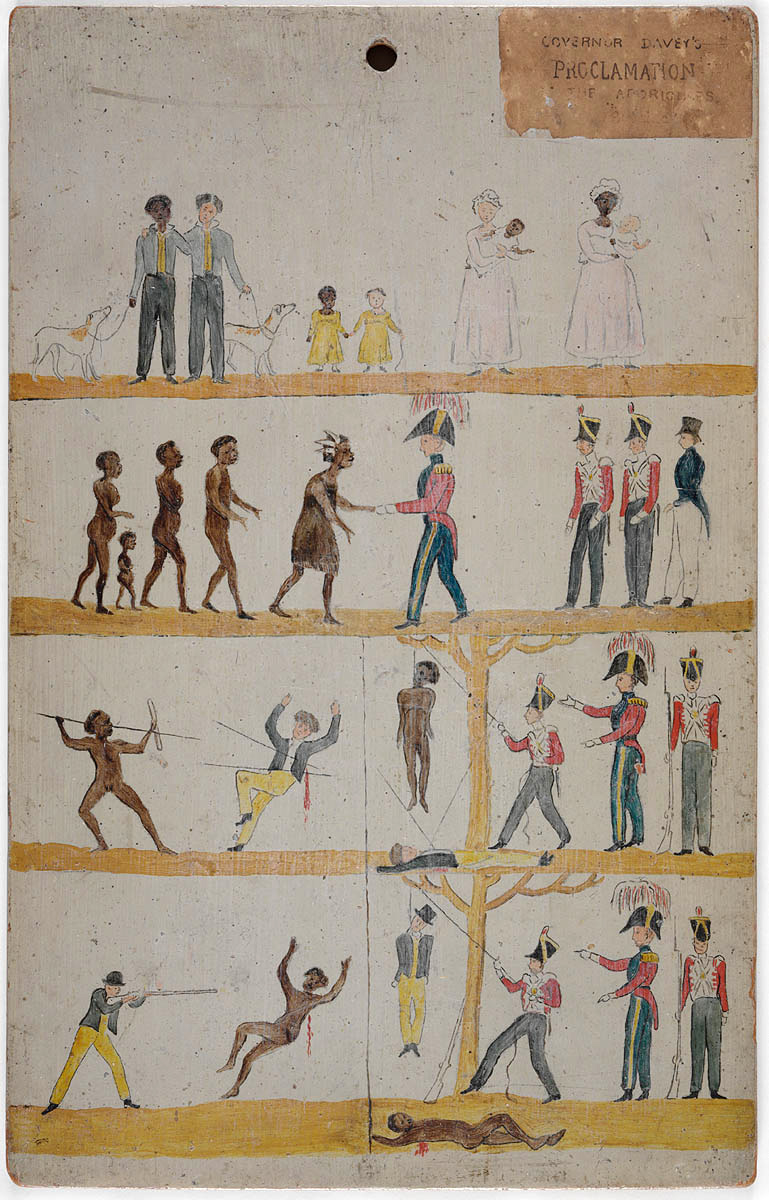
Proclamation board issued by George Arthur
(1828–1830)

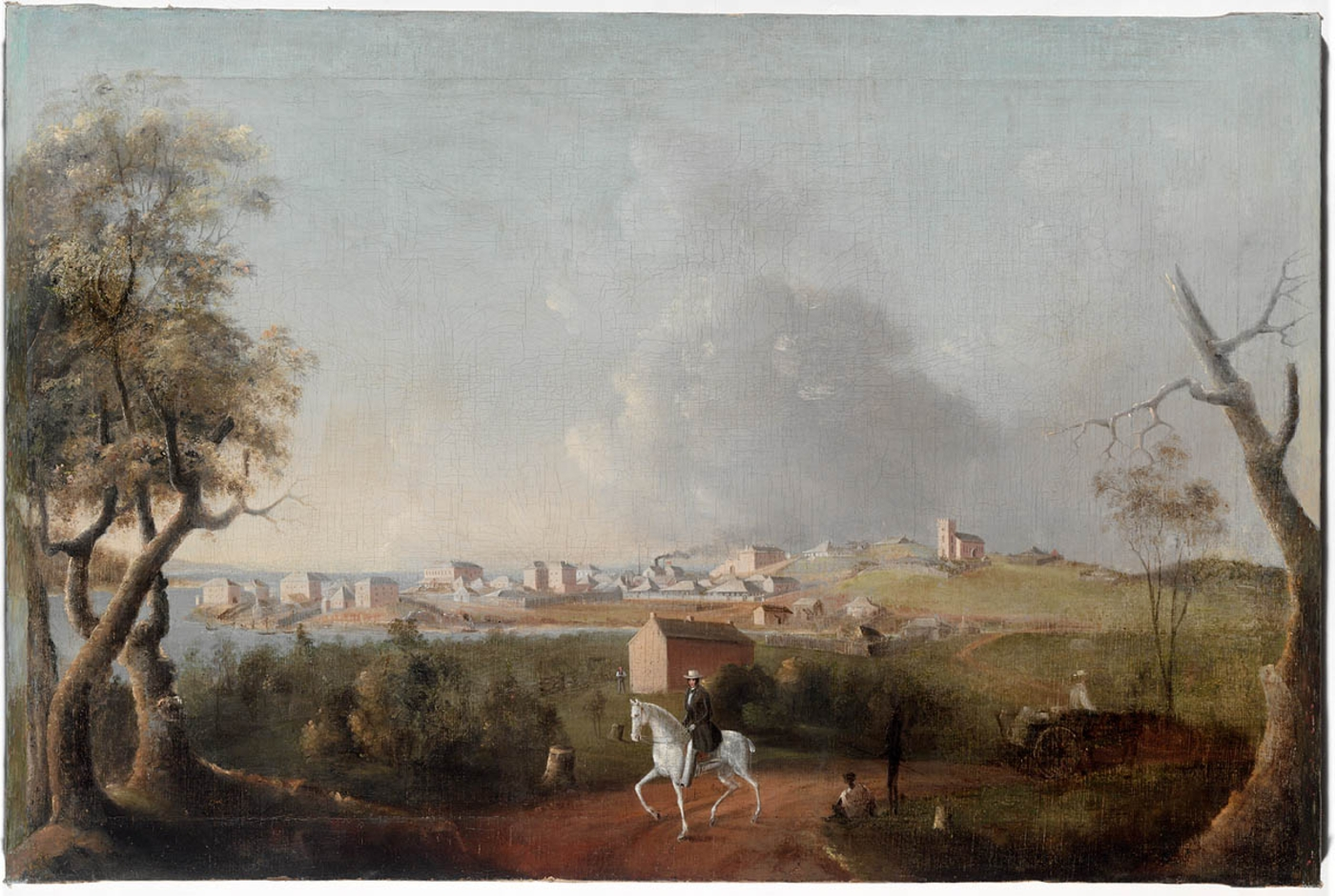
Port Macquarie, New South Wales by Joseph Backler
(c. 1835–1840)

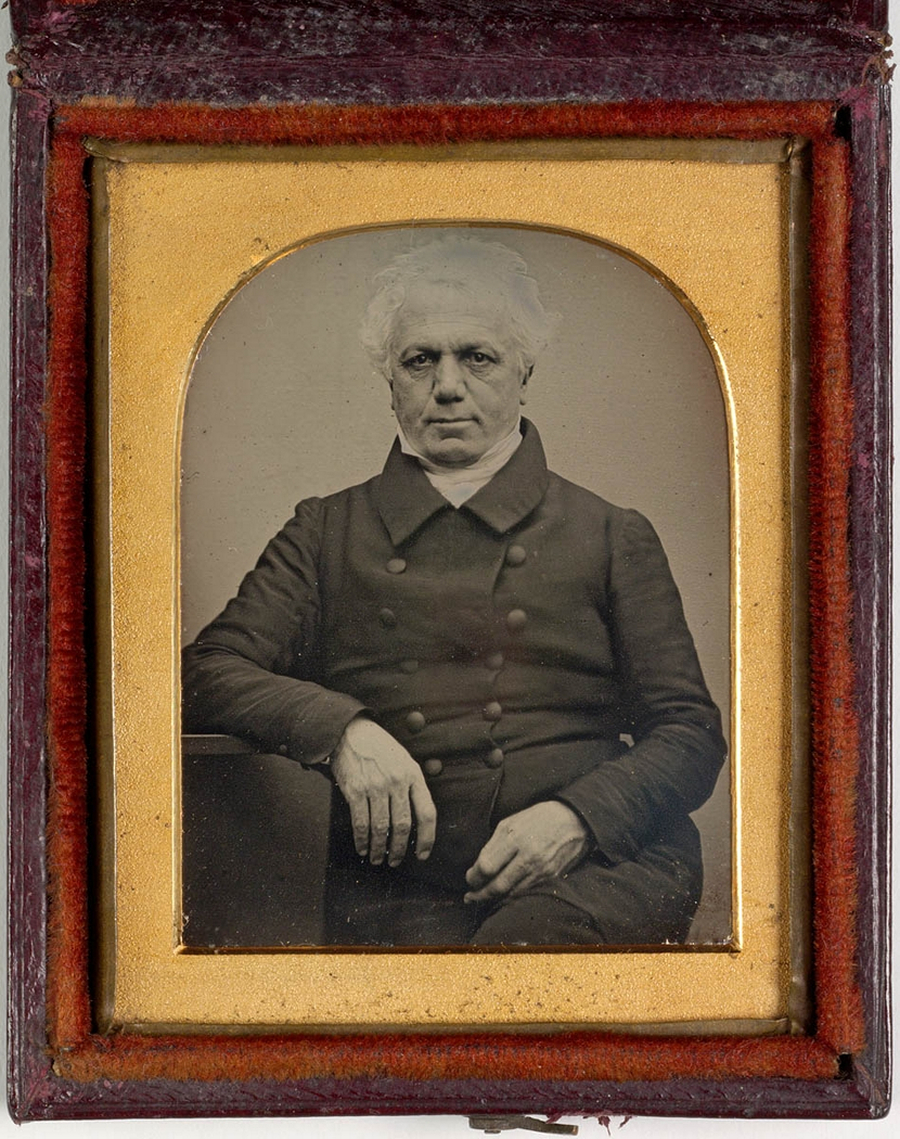
William Bland – the oldest-surviving Australian photograph
(c. 1845)

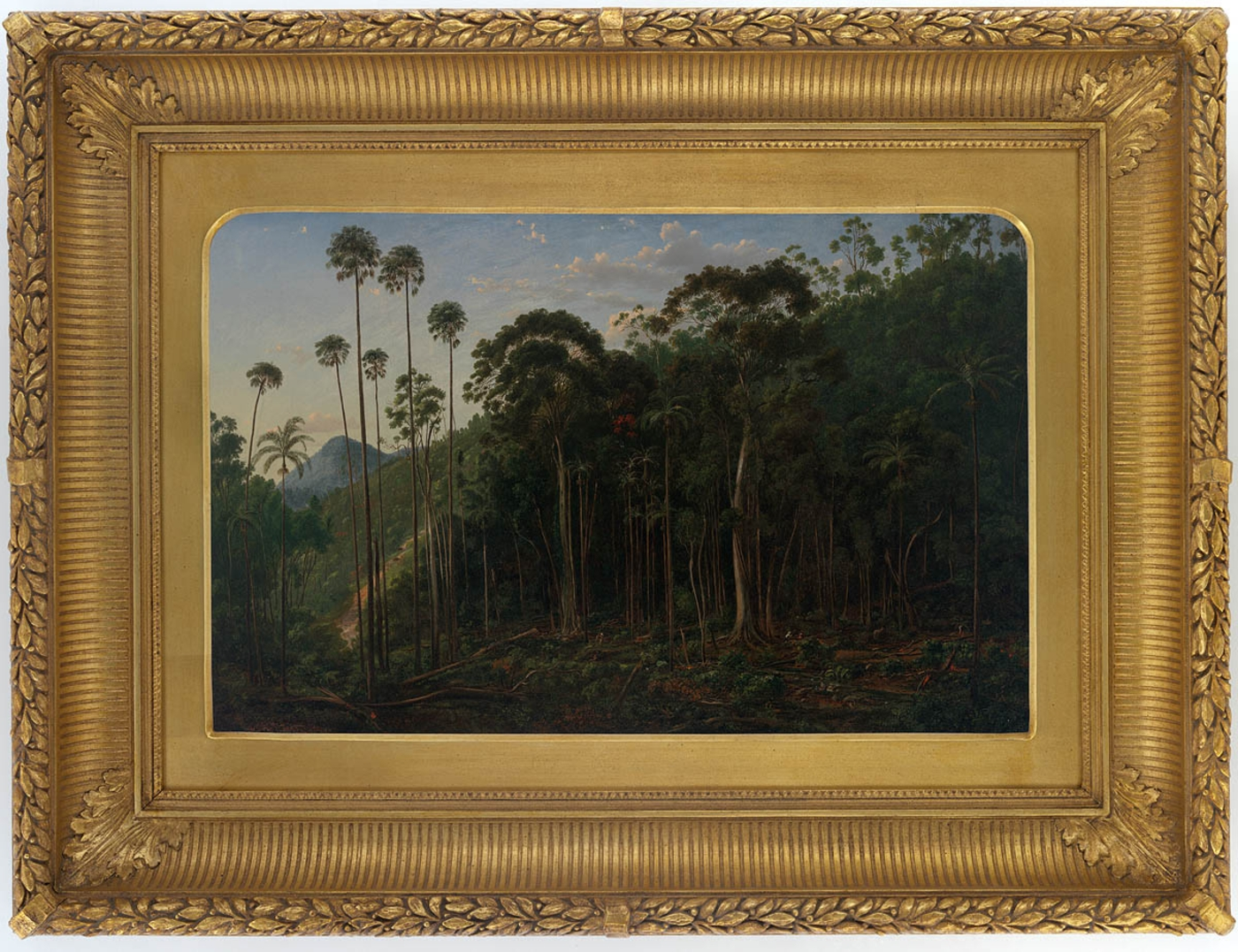
Cabbage Trees near the Shoalhaven River, by Eugene von Guerard
(1860)

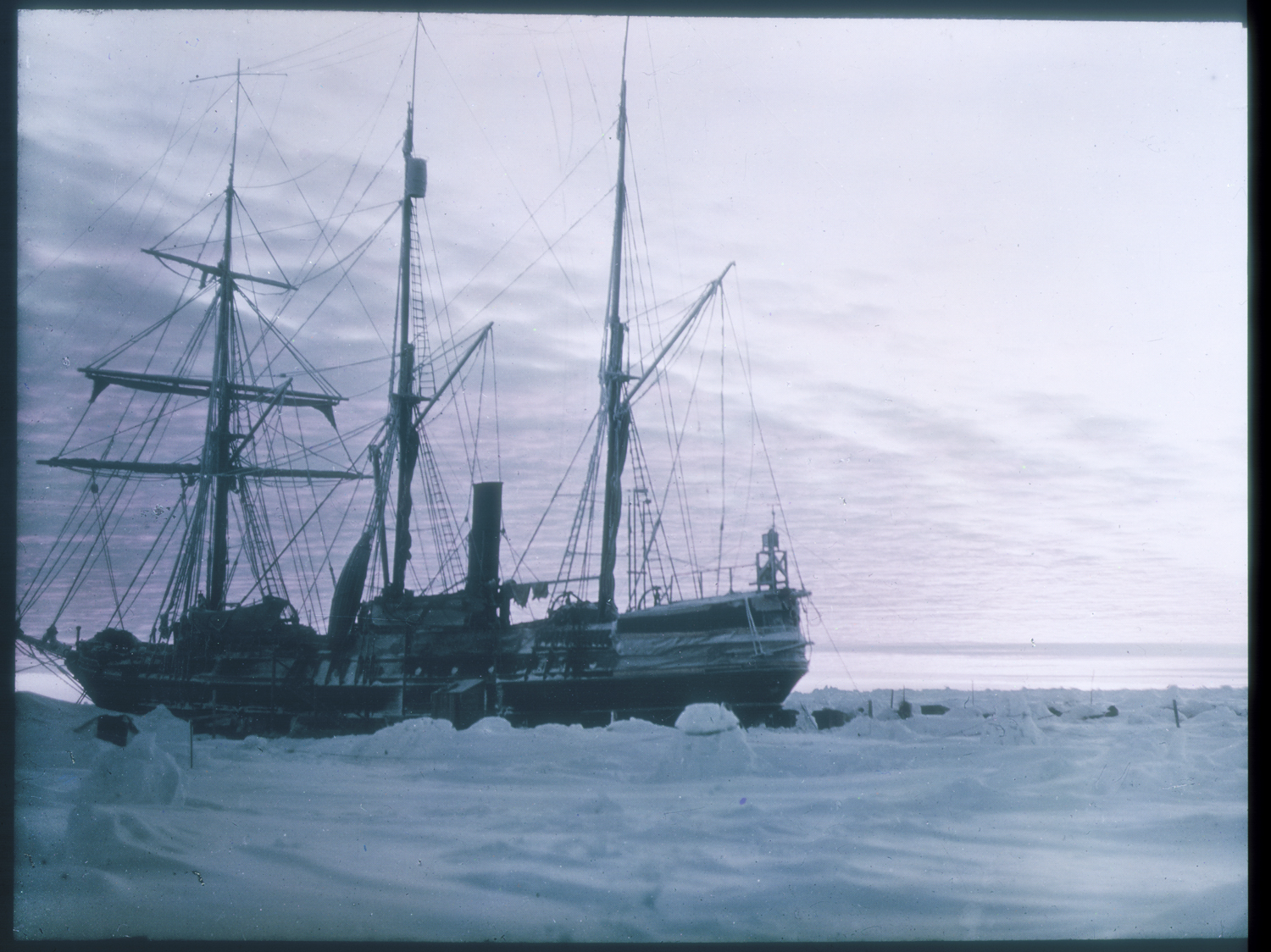
Photos of Shackleton's expedition to Antarctica by Frank Hurley
(1915)

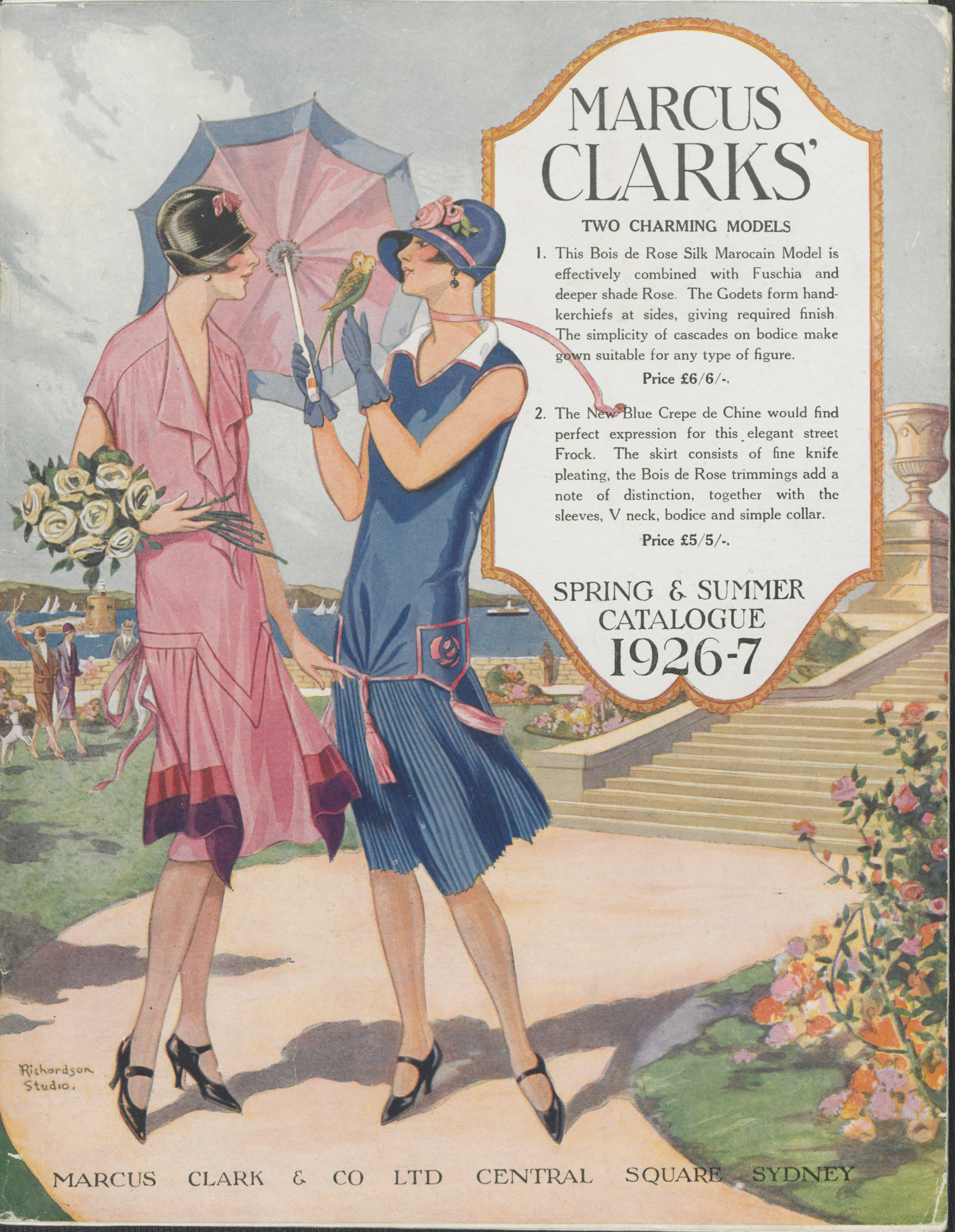
Cover of Marcus Clarks' spring & summer catalogue 1926–27

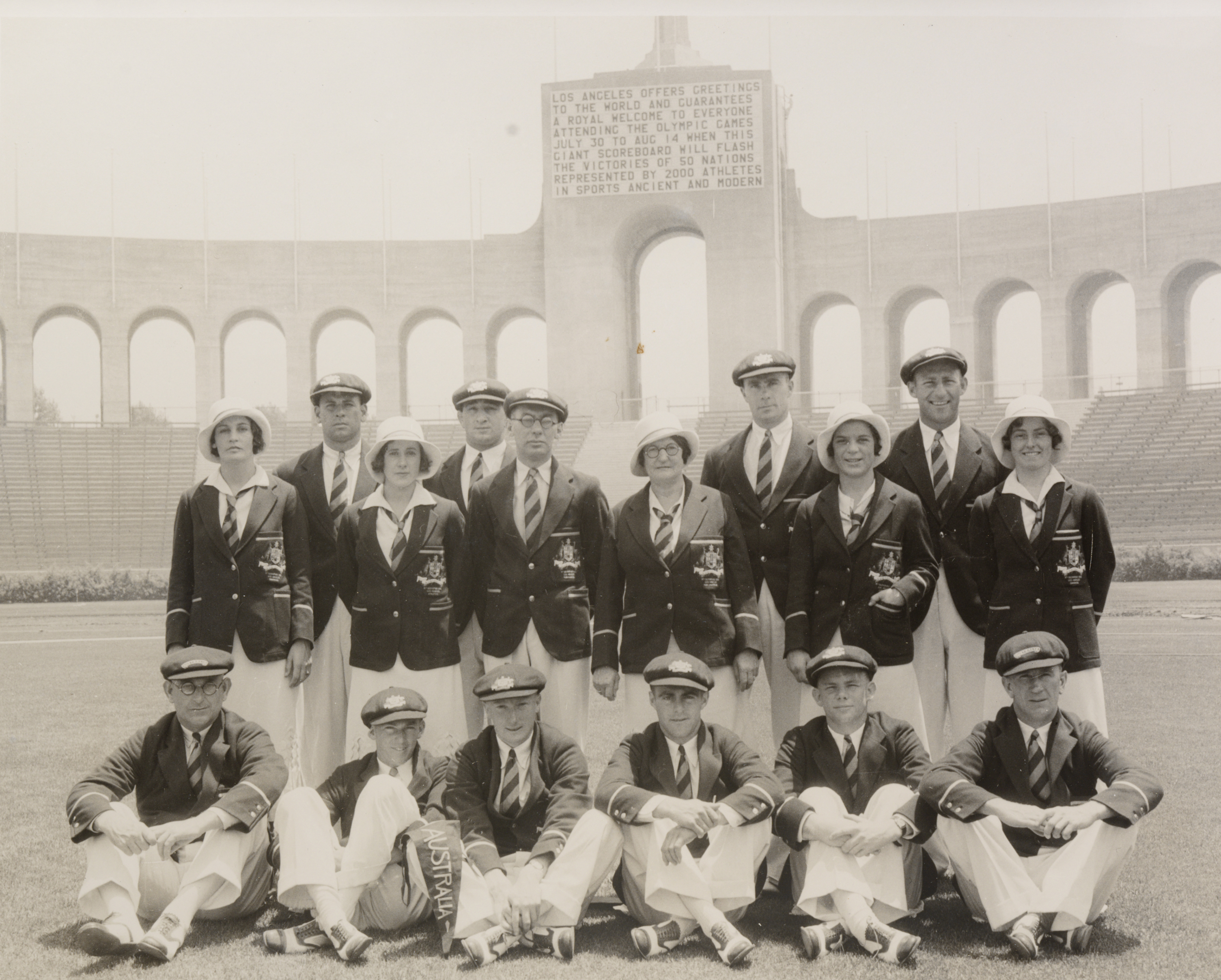
Eileen Wearne Olympic photographs and papers
(1920–1947)

=== Electronic resources ===
Computer cataloguing commenced in the early 1980s for books, and in 1992 for pictures and manuscripts. A large cataloguing backlog of material without an electronic record prompted the library's successful 2008 application for government funding to create over one million electronic catalogue records. The library subscribes to electronic databases which are accessible for cardholders via the catalogue. The digitisation of the papers of Sir Joseph Banks, completed in 1997, was the first digitisation project of original manuscripts undertaken by the library. It was followed by further digitisation of manuscript and picture collections including the papers of Matthew Flinders, the Hood collection of photographs by Sam Hood and son Ted Hood, and the Holtermann Collection of images of the NSW goldfields of the 1860s and 1870s, which is now listed on the UNESCO Australian Memory of the World Register. Digitised images of items from the library's collection are available in the catalogue, and some are also available through thematic online exhibitions. In 2012 the library received State Government funding to digitise 12 million pages from its collection, including newspapers, manuscripts, pictures and books.

=== Legal deposit ===
In Australia, legal deposit legislation exists at the national and state levels to support the provision of access to Australian research, heritage and culture. The Copyright Act 1968 governs legal deposit requirements at a national level. In New South Wales, legal deposit is required under the New South Wales Copyright Act 1879–1952, ss 5–7. The State Library of New South Wales, along with New South Wales Parliamentary Library and University of Sydney Library are entitled to "receive a copy of every book first published in New South Wales within two months of publication. 'Book' is defined in the Act as any book, newspaper, pamphlet, leaflet, music, map, chart or plan separately published and 'bound', sewed or stitched together'."

As a member library of National and State Libraries Australia, the organisation collaborated on the creation of the National edeposit (NED) system, which enables publishers from all over Australia to upload electronic publications as per the 2016 amendment to the Copyright Act 1968 and other regional legislation, and makes these publications publicly accessible online (depending on access conditions) from anywhere.

== Services ==
Access to the library reading rooms and galleries is free. There are a range of services that are accessible via a library card including remote access to electronic resources for NSW residents, access to books and other material from storage, and bookings for onsite study rooms. The library hosts free exhibitions, both from its own collections and from other organisations such as World Press Photo.

=== Relationship with NSW public libraries ===
The library administers the sections of the Library Act 1939 and the Library Regulation that relate to local authorities and public libraries in New South Wales. The library provides information, professional development programs, advice and the payment of grants and subsidies to local authorities operating New South Wales public libraries.

The State Library's Public Library Services team provides a research program on behalf of public libraries in New South Wales. This covers standards and guidelines for library buildings and services, economic value studies, services and management of public libraries.

=== Online services ===
The Australian Indigenous Index, or INFOKOORI, is an index to the fortnightly newspaper Koori Mail, covering from May 1991 to July 2016, as well as to biographical information from various magazines, including Identity (1971–1982); Our AIM (1907–1961); and Dawn (1952–1969) / New Dawn (1970–1975).

=== Collaborations with Wikimedia ===
The library has contributed to a number of Wikimedia projects, including:

- Added images to Wikimedia Commons
- Added State library of NSW collection items to Wikidata
- 2016–2023 the library has contributed to 1Lib1Ref

== Opening hours and transport connections ==
Reading Rooms & Exhibition Galleries

- Monday to Thursday (9 am to 8 pm)
- Friday (9 am to 5 pm)
- Weekends (10 am to 5 pm)

Library Bar

- Wednesday to Saturday (4 pm till late)

Mode	Station/Stop	Services
Trains	Martin Place	North West & Bankstown Eastern Suburbs & Illawarra
Trains	St James	Leppington & Inner West; Liverpool & Inner West; Airport & South
Trains	Circular Quay	Leppington & Inner West; Liverpool & Inner West; Airport & South
Buses	Macquarie Street	200, Sydney Explorer; Timetable
Ferries	Circular Quay	Timetable

== History ==
The first library collections were part of the Australian Subscription Library which was started by a group of wealthy Sydney citizens in 1826. It was then purchased for £5,100 by the New South Wales Government in 1869 and became the Sydney Free Public Library. In 1895 it was renamed the Public Library of New South Wales until its most recent name change in 1975, when it became the State Library of New South Wales.

=== Establishment (1826–1900) ===
The Australian Subscription Library was established in 1826 at a meeting at the Sydney Hotel chaired by barrister John Mackaness. Library membership was subject to committee approval. James Mitchell, father of David Scott Mitchell (who would later bequeath his collection to the library), was a committee member from 1832 to 1853 and Vice President from 1856 to 1869.

In December 1827 operations began in rented premises in Pitt Street and in the two years following, the library led a peripatetic existence having been located a few years in George Street, Bridge Street, Macquarie Street and Macquarie Place. The library had financial problems and required more space to house its growing collections but negotiations in 1838 to construct a new library building broke down over member unwillingness to broaden access to the library. Fortunately for the members later negotiations with the government were more successful and construction of a new library building began in 1843. The foundation stone for this new building, on the corner of Bent and Macquarie Streets, was laid by Alexander Macleay and the library was opened in 1845.

Financial difficulties continued, and by 1869 the subscription library was in serious debt. The New South Wales Government was persuaded to buy it for £5,100 (£1,500 for the books and £3,600 for the building). In September 1869, the Sydney Free Public Library opened its doors with a stock of 20,000 volumes. Over 60,000 people visited the library in its first year of operation as the Free Public Library. Robert Cooper Walker was appointed Principal Librarian. He, in collaboration with the Trustees (led by Charles Badham), worked to expand the educational role of the library both through collection expansion and the production of printed catalogues of the library's collection.

The library expanded its operations, opening a lending branch in 1877. This lending branch was handed to the Sydney Municipal Council in 1909 and later became the City of Sydney Library. Another of Walker's initiatives was to establish services across the state, with loans to organisations including the Wollongong School of Arts and the Mechanics' Institute at Plattsburg (modern-day Wallsend) and services for regional libraries from 1883. The library's collection continued to grow, causing continual storage and overcrowding problems; new additions included a First Folio in 1885 and the papers of William Bligh in 1902.

=== The Mitchell and Dixson bequests (1900–1929) ===
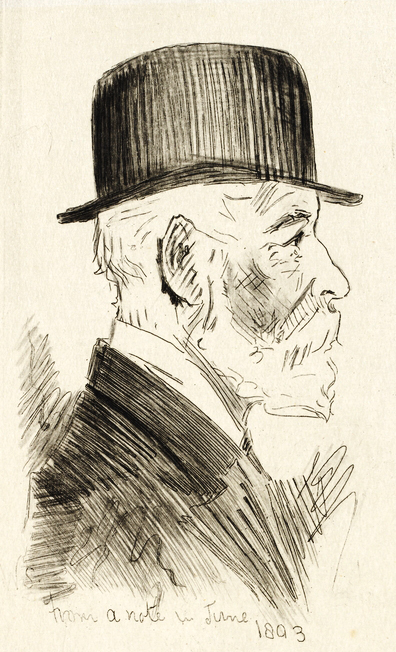
Sketch of D S Mitchell, detail from L. Lindsay etching of W. Syer sketch, State Library NSW

Australiana was a collecting focus for the library and David Scott Mitchell's collecting activities came to the attention of Henry Charles Lennox Anderson, Principal Librarian from 1893–1906. Anderson's stated aim of making the library a "National, and not a Municipal, Library" led him to collect Australiana material. However, Mitchell's efforts to collect as many books and manuscripts relating to Australia, the Pacific, the East Indies and Antarctica, particularly from 1886 onwards, created competition for these materials. Anderson realised that the library did not have the budget or contacts to compete with Mitchell (from the 1880s onward, George Robertson gave Mitchell first right of refusal on Australiana material purchased by Angus & Robertson), and attempted to build a working relationship with Mitchell. In 1898, Mitchell announced his intention to leave his collection to the people of New South Wales, subject to conditions including that the collection once acquired would be named "The Mitchell Library" and be permanently arranged and kept in a special wing or set of rooms dedicated for that purpose. Although his offer was quickly accepted, construction of a new building to house the collection was delayed for several years.

Construction commenced in 1906, one year before Mitchell's death. Following Anderson's resignation in 1907, Frank Murcott Bladen (former head of the library's lending branch) was appointed Principal Librarian. In 1909, Hugh Wright was appointed to the newly created position of Mitchell Librarian; the creation of this role was another condition of Mitchell's bequest. Nita Kibble was another early member of the library staff. The Mitchell Library officially opened on 8 March 1910; Mungo MacCallum, then President of the Library Board of Trustees, spoke at the opening. The public library remained in the Bent Street building.

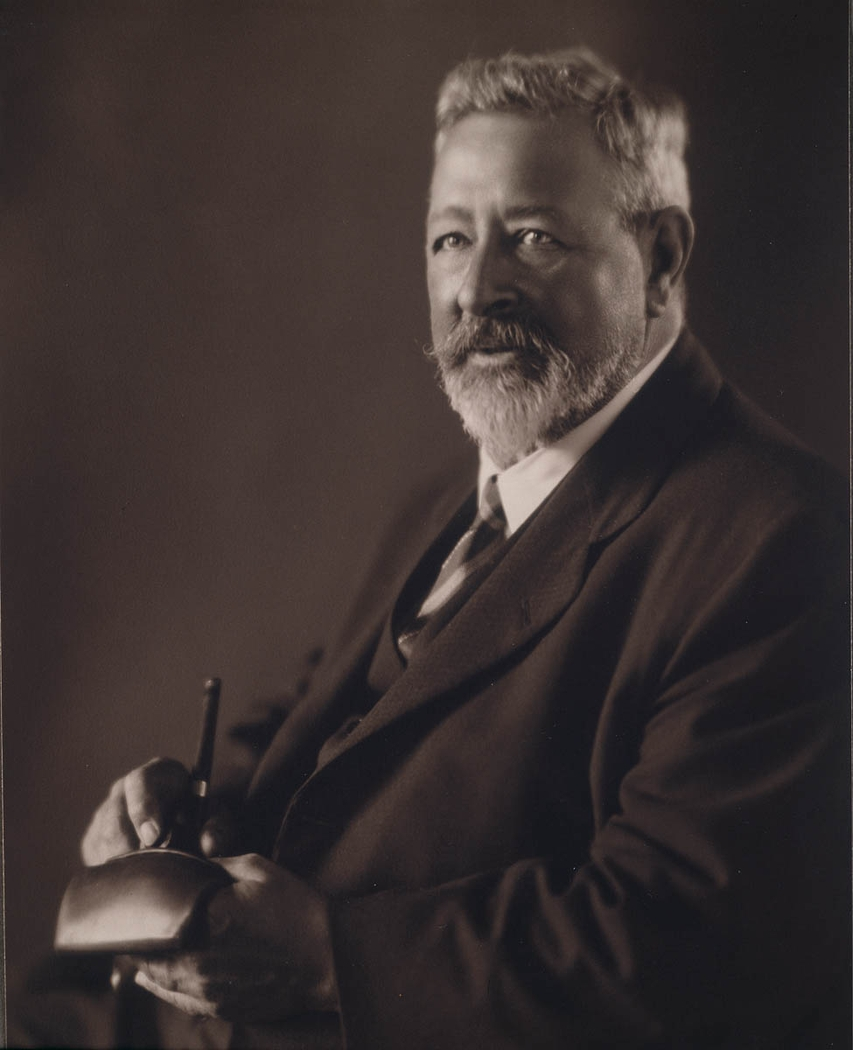
Portrait of Sir William Dixson

Mitchell had not kept a catalogue of his collection, and as a result, cataloguing was an early priority for librarians in the Mitchell Library. A research department was established as part of the public library in the 1920s under the direction of Nita Kibble, while Ida Leeson as Head of Acquisitions researched gaps in the library's collections. Kibble's research department was later used as a model by other State Libraries when establishing similar services. Mitchell's bequest also included funding for collection acquisition; expanding the library's collection (particularly in the area of Australiana and Pacific material) was a priority for both Wright and William Ifould, who was appointed Principal Librarian in 1912. Ifould envisioned the library as a repository of material relating to the history of Australia, not just New South Wales, and led efforts to collect material. The library acquired the papers of Lachlan Macquarie and his family in 1914, Matthew Flinders in 1922, and Abel Tasman's journal in 1926, and after World War I collected journals of soldiers from that conflict. The Commonwealth Parliamentary Library (now the National Library of Australia), established in 1901, was also collecting Australiana material. This led to conflict over the acquisition of the papers of James Cook, which were offered at auction in London in 1923. The Trustees chose not to bid for the papers as doing so would have limited the library's Australiana acquisitions budget for several years and Ifould, already in London with hopes of purchasing the papers for the Mitchell Library, was directed instead to purchase them on behalf of the Commonwealth Parliamentary Library and the Public Library of New South Wales using funds provided by the Federal Government.

Sir William Dixson offered in 1919 to leave his collection of pictures, manuscripts and other materials relating to Australiana and the Pacific (particularly early European exploration) to the library; his offer was accepted in 1924. After a series of delays construction began on a new wing to house the collection, which was opened on 21 October 1929. Dixson was the guest of honour at the opening of an exhibition to mark the centenary of Mitchell's birth in 1936, and also paid for the bronze doors added to the Mitchell building in 1942, when extensions were added. His entire collection passed to the library after his death in 1952.

=== Growth and change (1930–1980) ===
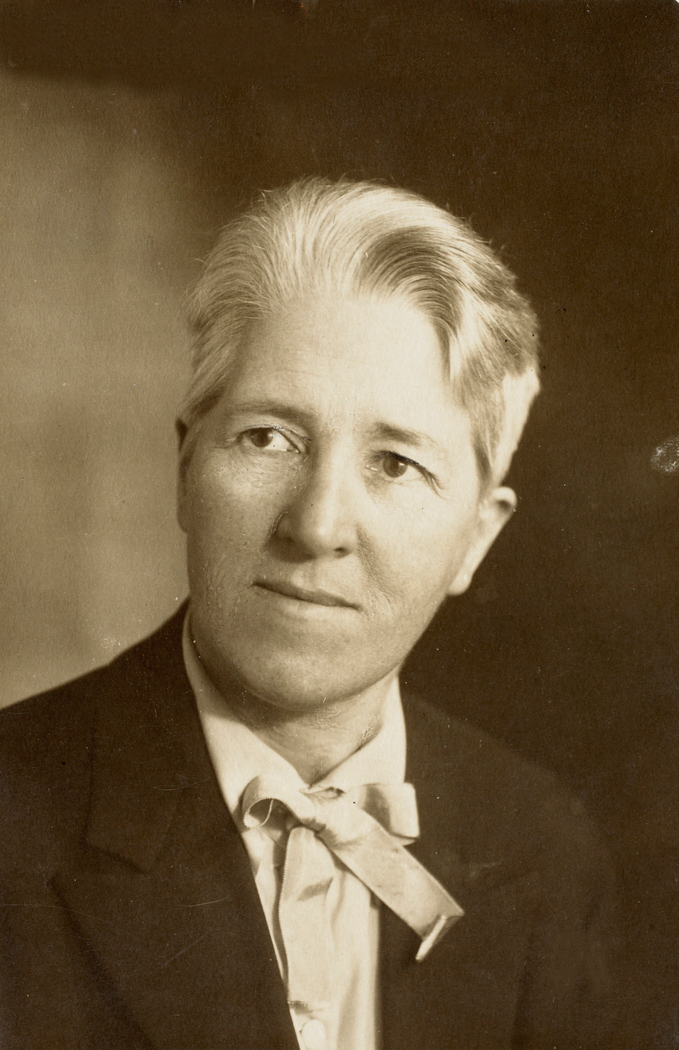
Ida Leeson in 1933 after being made Mitchell librarian

Wright retired in 1932 and Ida Leeson was appointed Mitchell Librarian. In the 1930s, many women in the workforce suffered discrimination on the basis of gender, and her appointment caused controversy due to the seniority of the position. The Library Trustees appointed a committee to consider the applicants and make an appointment. Despite the committee's support of Leeson (and general support of the Trustees for appointing the most suitable candidate regardless of gender), the Minister for Public Instruction was unwilling to approve the appointment due to the assumption that the Mitchell Librarian would deputise for the Principal Librarian and an unwillingness to see a woman in that role. A new position of Deputy Principal Librarian was created and filled by John Wallace Metcalfe, a librarian who had worked in the public library for nine years. This role would sit above the Mitchell Librarian role in the organisation's hierarchy. The decision to create it was criticised by the National Council of Women.

In 1934, Ralph Munn and E. R. Pitt led an inquiry into Australian libraries. Their report contrasted the regional library network in Australia with that in the United States of America and England, and recommended that further efforts be made to establish and support regional libraries. Their recommendations included the establishment of free public libraries in every local council area; this was enshrined in the Library Act 1939, which Ifould and Metcalfe helped to draft. Metcalfe also founded the Australian Institute of Librarians (now the Australian Library and Information Association) in 1937, the first professional body representing librarians, and was heavily involved in the Free library movement in 1935.

New indexes were created and cataloguing efforts continued to make the library's collections more accessible, while some books were placed on open access. The collection continued to grow. The Macarthur family papers were acquired in 1940, and in 1954 much of Miles Franklin's personal and literary papers came to the library after her death. The remaining papers from her collection were sold at auction to a private collector, and acquired 30 years later by the library. In collaboration with the State Library of Victoria and the National Library of Australia, a bibliography of sources relating to Asia and the Pacific was compiled in response to public interest sparked by World War II.

John Metcalfe was appointed Principal Librarian in 1942 following Ifould's retirement. Four years later Ida Leeson also retired, and Phyllis Mander-Jones was appointed as her successor, after a short time as Deputy Mitchell Librarian. During her tenure she prepared a report comparing archival practice in Australia with other countries, and arranged the acquisition of additional papers of the Macarthur family and the New South Wales Supreme Court's early records.

Metcalfe was an advocate for free public libraries and supported their establishment throughout his career. After Mander-Jones took leave in 1956, Jean Arnot was appointed Acting Mitchell Librarian. Three years later, after Metcalfe's retirement, Gordon Richardson was appointed as Principal Librarian. A series of position changes saw the Deputy Principal Librarian and Mitchell Librarians absorbed into the Principal Librarian position filled by Richardson. This situation remained until Richardson's retirement in 1973; his successor, Russell Doust, re-established the Mitchell Librarian role as a separate one and appointed Suzanne Mourot.

Dorothea Mackellar's papers were acquired in 1970, and Jørn Utzon's Sydney Opera House archive in 1972. The collection expanded in a new area with an oral history project, run in 1976, interviewing past staff members. By 1978, all government archives had been moved to the State Records Authority of New South Wales (then called the Archives Authority of New South Wales), which had been established in 1960 and was housed at the library until 1978.

=== The library today ===
Computer cataloguing of the library's collections began in the 1980s. The Australian Bicentenary prompted increasing public discussion about Australian society and history, and an increasing consciousness of women's history, multiculturalism in Australian society, and Indigenous Australian societies and histories. The library responded to public discussion by increasing research into Indigenous material held at the library, creating and filling identified Indigenous Services Librarians positions in 1991, and establishing an Indigenous Unit in 2013. The Rainbow Archives project was established in the 1980s, and migrants were interviewed to record oral histories for the collection.

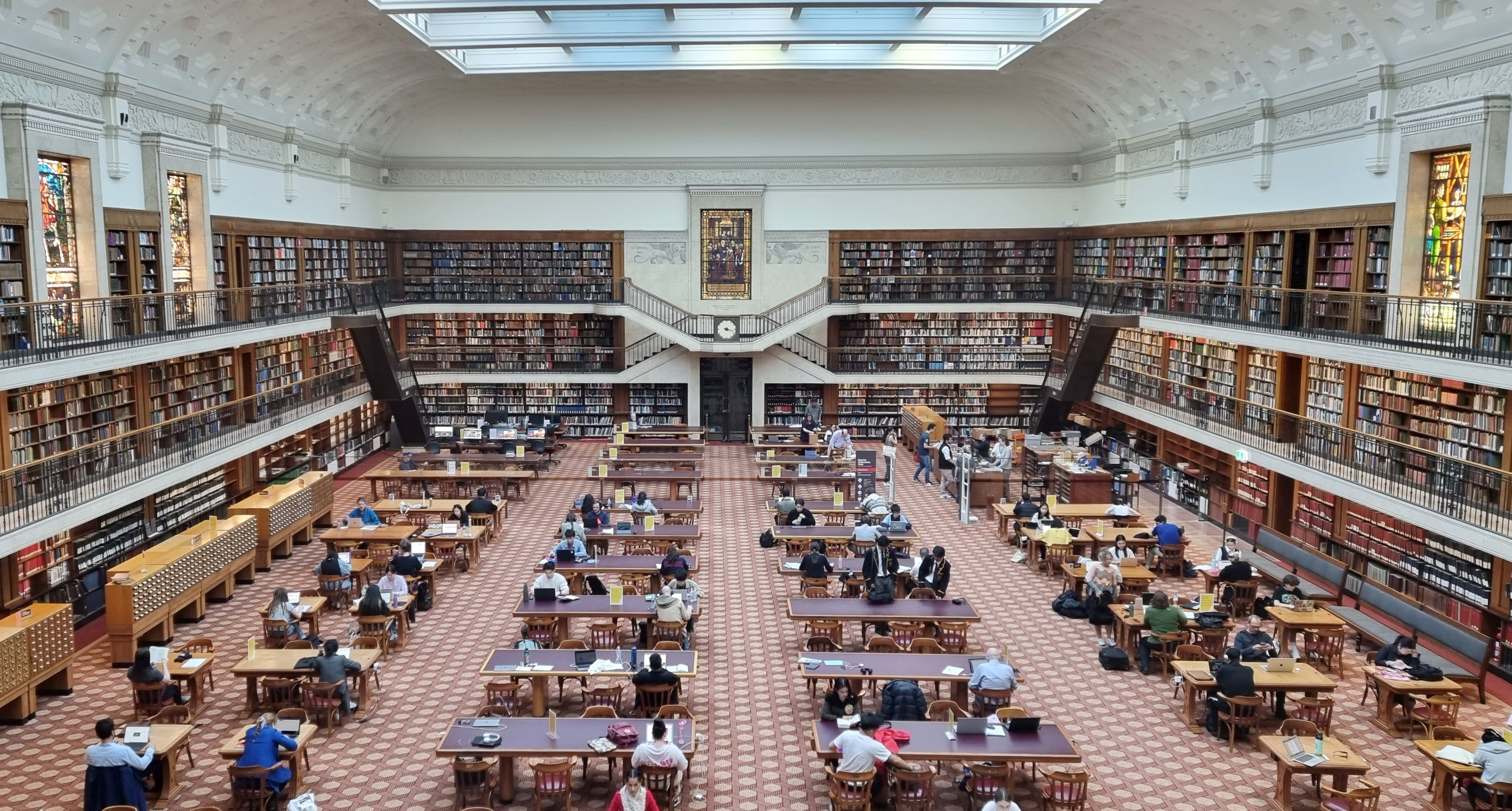
Reading Room, State Library of New South Wales, 2023

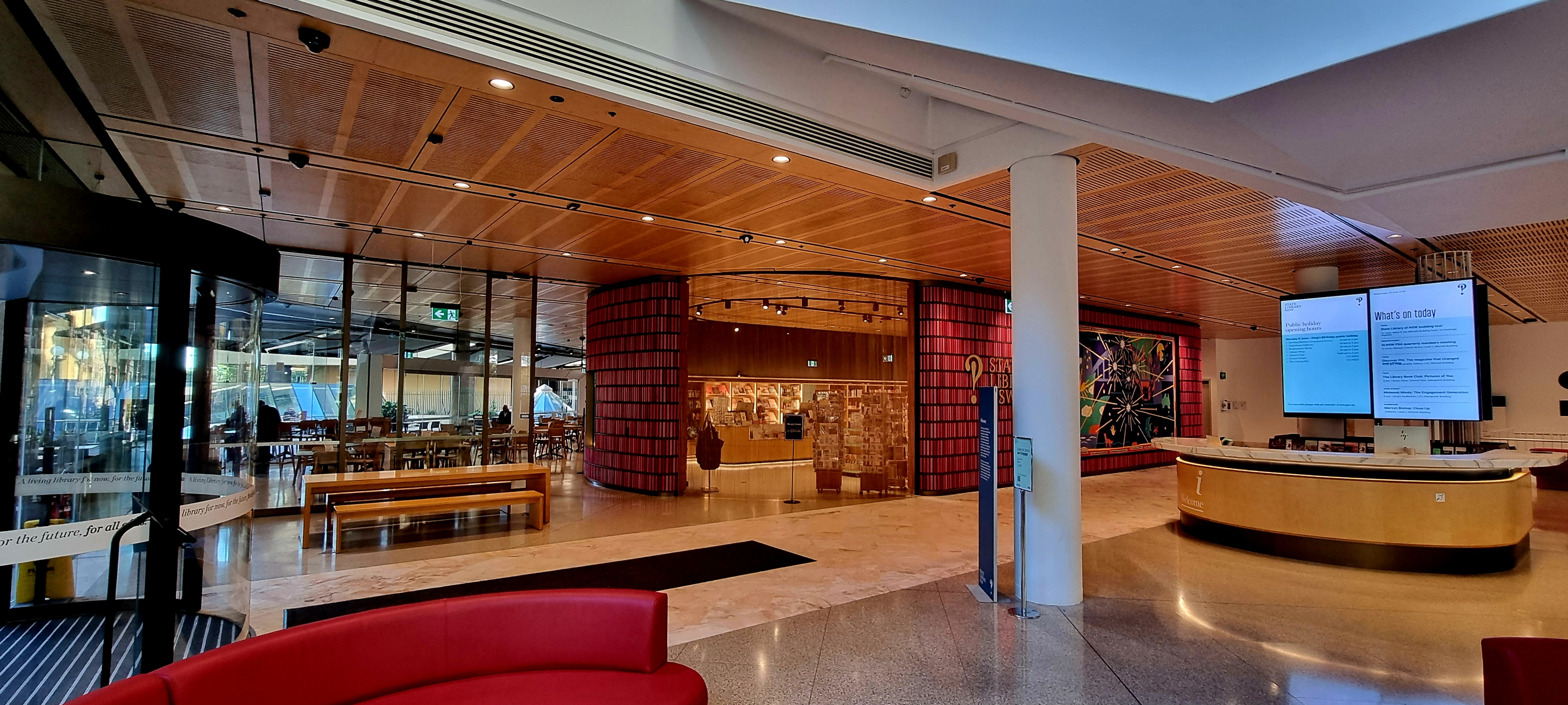
Main entry Macquarie Building, State Library of New South Wales, 2026

Russell Doust retired in 1987 and was succeeded by Alison Crook, who commenced in the role months before the opening of the new Macquarie Street Wing. 1988 also saw a major exhibition on the arrival of the First Fleet and the interactions of the European arrivals with the Indigenous people of the area, the Eora peoples.

In 1998 the library acquired two large collections. The papers of George Bass were purchased for what was then the highest price paid at auction for manuscripts related to Australian topics. The estate of Jean Garling, author and dancer, passed to the library on her death. The library collections continue to expand, with recent acquisitions including 201 personal letters of surveyor John Septimus Roe (1797–1878) and the Edward Close sketchbook (1817–1818). In 2013 the library acquired two memorials written by Portuguese explorer Pedro Fernandes de Queirós to King Philip appealing for funding for an expedition to the fabled Terra Australis. The library holds a copy of all thirteen known surviving memorials.

In early 2014 controversy erupted over proposed changes to the Mitchell Library. A petition of over 200 well-known writers and academics was soon joined by over 9,000 other library users including historians, architects, archaeologists, academics and family historians. In reply the State Librarian, Alex Byrne, issued an open letter, and other writers debated the role of libraries in the digital age. In response the Library announced a restoration programme which effectively reversed the proposed changes.

On 22 March 2020 the Library buildings were closed to the public to help protect the health of visitors and staff and to minimise the spread of COVID-19 (coronavirus) in New South Wales. It continued providing access to its online services during the shutdown period and reopened under NSW Health guidelines on 13 July 2020. After the easing of NSW COVID-19 restrictions the Library reverted to its normal opening hours on 8 March 2021. Due to a second outbreak of COVID-19 in the Sydney CBD on 25 June 2021 the Library followed advice from NSW Health and stopped public access to the building before re-opening on the 11 October 2021.

On 12 May 2025 the Macquarie Street building, including the Bashir Reading Room, Library bookshop and cafe, were temporarily closed for a major refurbishment of the building. Changes included and improved entrance, refurbished reading rooms, and an expanded cafe and bookshop. It reopened 9 December 2025.

== Architecture ==
=== The Mitchell Building ===
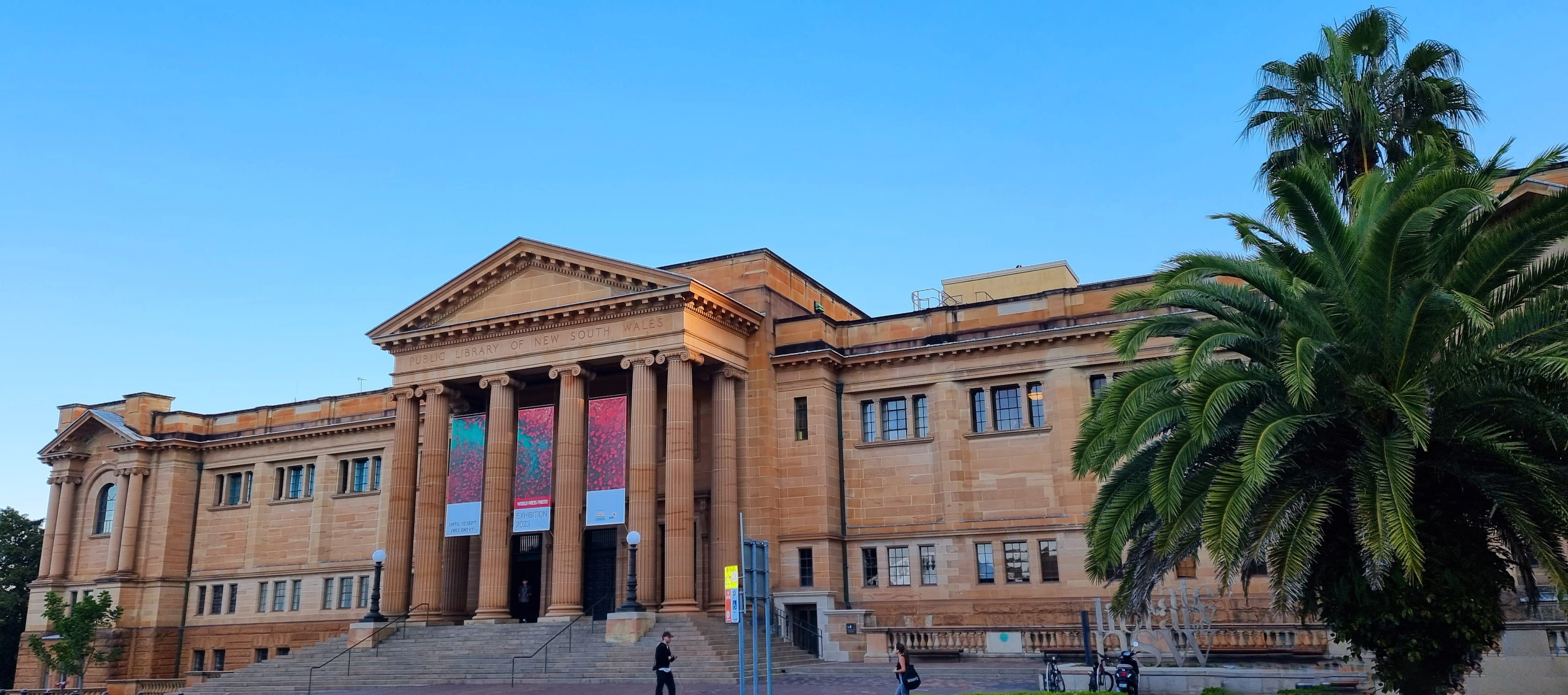
Mitchell Building, State Library of New South Wales

By the 1890s, the library was running out of space to house its collection and accommodate staff in its building on the corner of Bent and Macquarie streets. Plans were underway for a new 'national' library building. The stimulus for this was David Scott Mitchell's offer of his extensive collection of Australiana to the people of New South Wales.

The condition of his offer was that his collection be housed either in the Public Library building or in a separate new building; as there was no room in the Public Library building and no suitable building existed a new building was erected. Work on the Mitchell Wing of the new building began in 1906 and finished in 1910 based on designs prepared by Walter Liberty Vernon, the Head of the Government Architect's Branch. The Mitchell Wing upon completion housed library reading rooms, work areas and the Mitchell bequest.

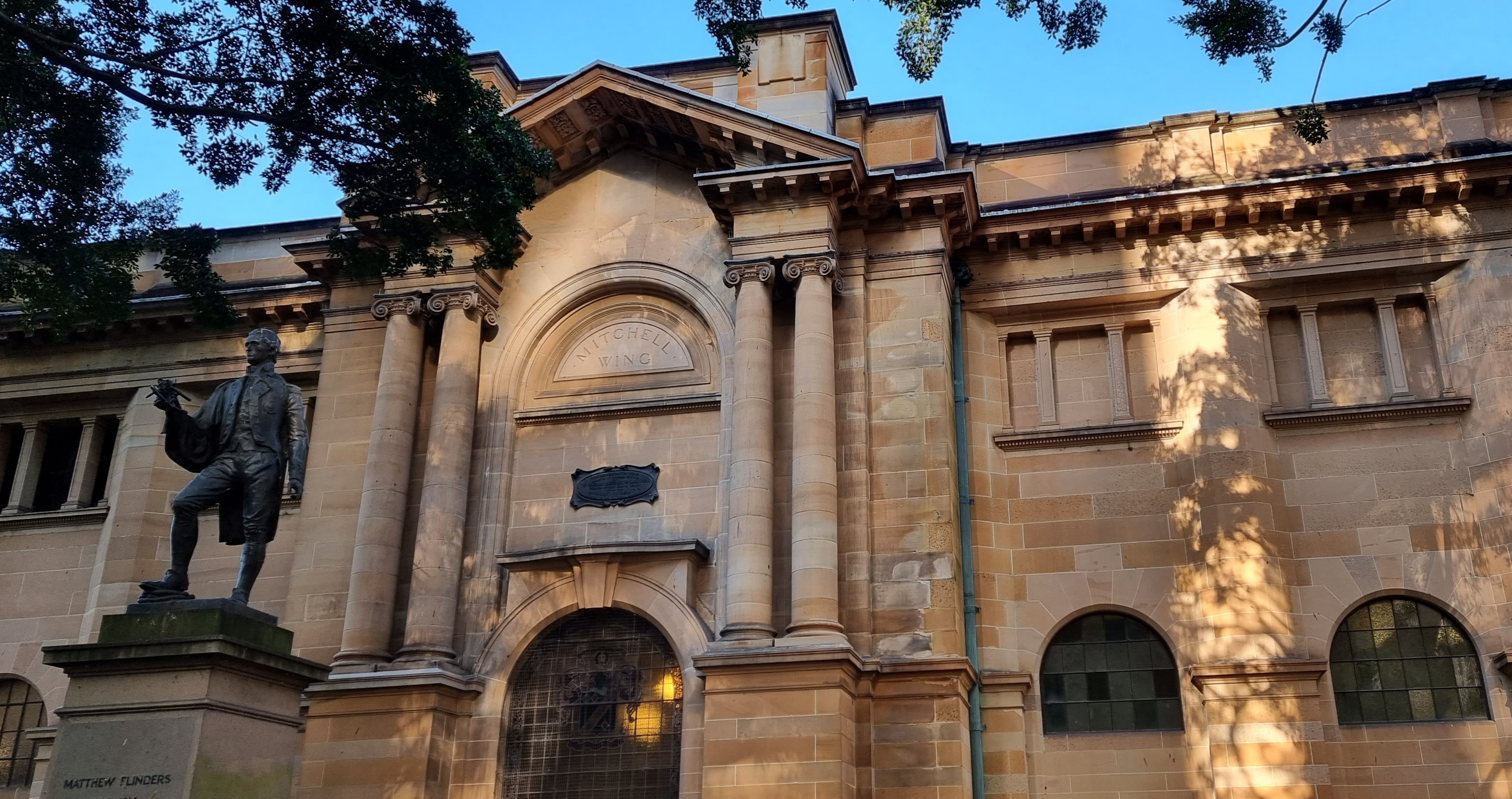
Mitchell and Dixson wings of the Mitchell Building, State Library of New South Wales

Nineteen years after the completion of the Mitchell Wing, more building took place on the site of the state library. The Dixson Wing, designed by architect Richard Macdonald Seymour Wells and completed in 1929, was added to the south side of the Mitchell Wing to provide storage and gallery space for the extensive collection of historical paintings presented to the library by Sir William Dixson. The galleries were refurbished in 1987 in preparation for the bicentennial exhibition held at the library in 1988.

In 1939 work began on the central section of the building, including the portico, the ornate vestibule and its reproduced Tasman Map in marble mosaic and the main reading room. The building was ready to be used in June 1942 and the Library (as a whole) was under one roof. Bronze doors were presented by William Dixson and were decorated with a series of images depicting Indigenous Australian people and European explorers. In 1964, the final section of the sandstone Mitchell Building was laid on the south east corner. This was designed by Alan Robertson from the Government Architect's Branch; one of the junior architects on the team was Andrew Andersons, who would later be principal architect for the design of the Macquarie Street Wing. Within 10 years the Library had outgrown this space too.

The Mitchell Wing celebrated its centenary in 2010 and in the lead-up to its centenary (from 2001), held a series of related exhibitions and events.

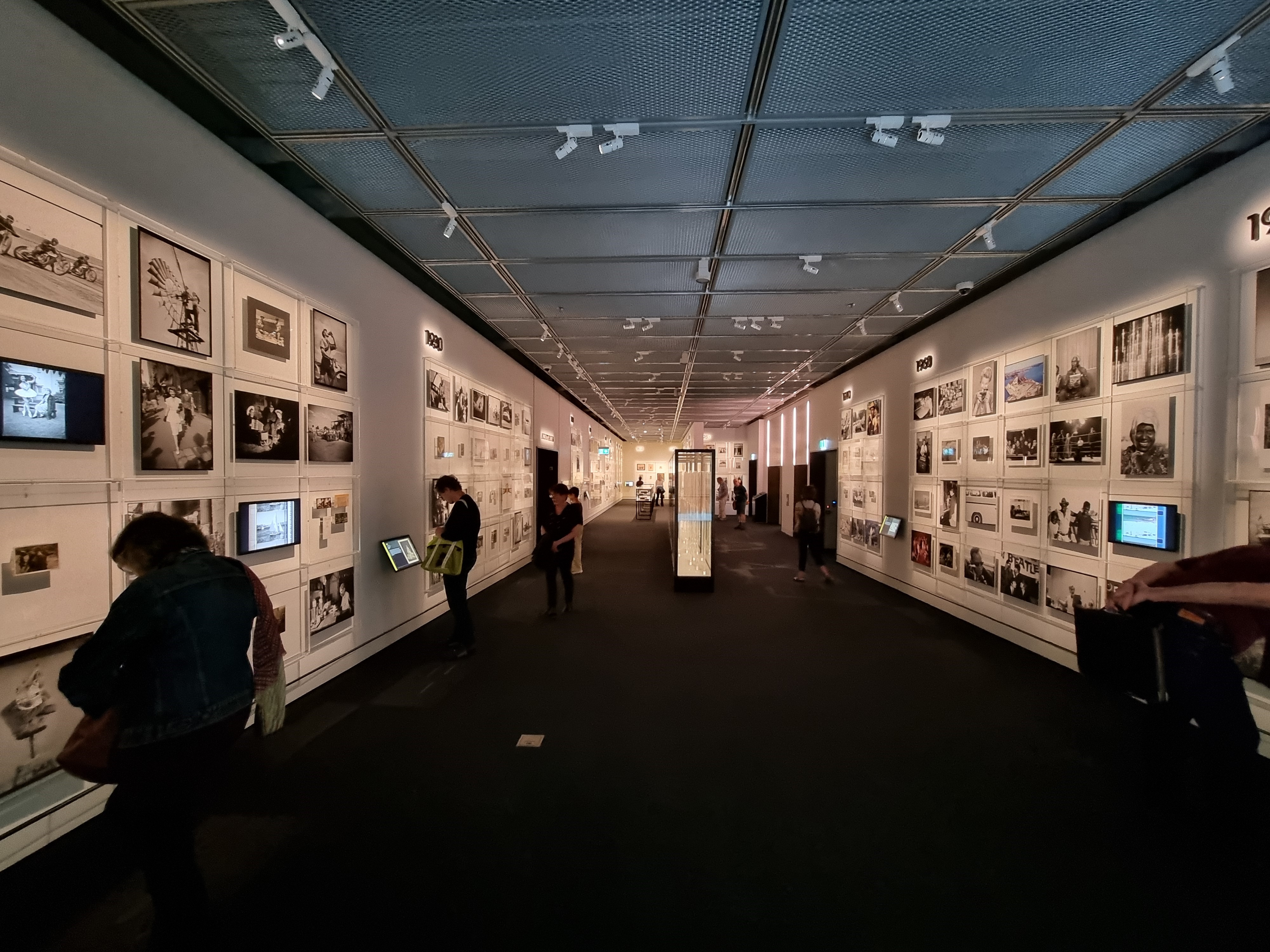
Photo Gallery, Shot Exhibition, State Library of NSW

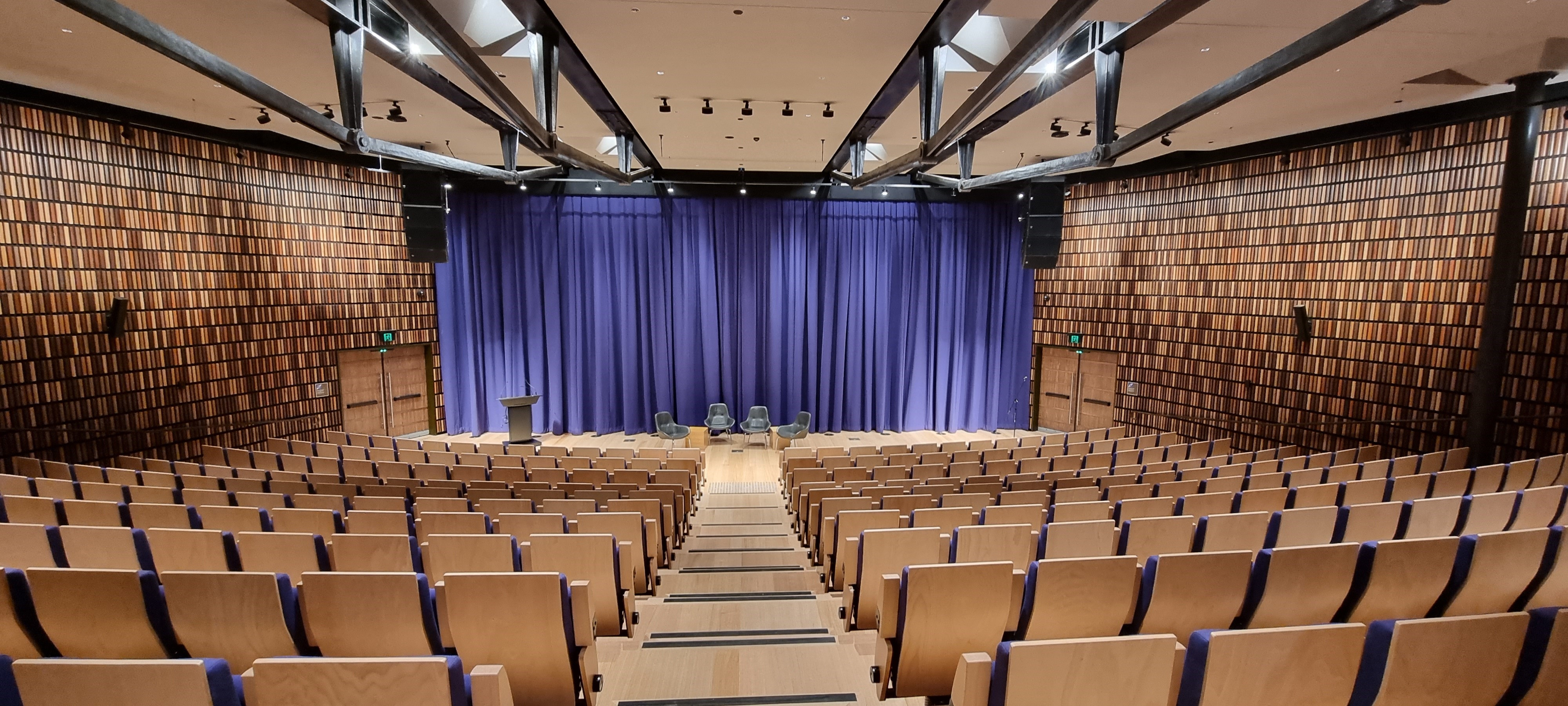
Auditorium, State Library of New South Wales, 2023

Between 2018 and 2023 major new permanent and temporary exhibition spaces were opened in the Mitchell Building. These exhibition spaces are largely format based. On display in the Mitchell and Dixson wings are: over 300 Australian oil paintings on permanent display; a rotating 6-month exhibition of works on paper (watercolours and drawings); and a First Nations gallery which opened to the public in 2018.

The building also houses the Column Gallery, an exhibition space housed in the south-eastern side of the Mitchell building. This gallery space required a complete redesign of the old 1960s office and workspaces and was opened to the public in 2018. The building also houses a permanent photographic gallery on the Lower ground level and a map room both opened in 2018.

In 2022 work was completed on upgrading the Mitchell Library Reading Room which had remained largely unchanged since it opened to the public in 1942. Changes included new carpet, desks and chairs. The Dalgety walkway access was also filled in to allow for additional seating for readers. The Library's new 350 seat underground auditorium was opened on Sunday 29 October 2023.

=== The Macquarie Street Building ===
Further space was required for collection storage and public spaces, as well as staff work areas. Space became available south of the Mitchell Wing in the 1970s, when several buildings were demolished and Richmond Villa relocated to accommodate a new building for State Parliament, although this was initially used for temporary accommodation for parliamentary staff. Work began on the Macquarie Street Wing in 1983 and it was opened in 1988—Australia's bicentenary—by Queen Elizabeth II in company with Prince Philip. The new building fronts Macquarie Street and links up with the Mitchell Wing above ground and below ground. Andrew Andersons of the Government Architects Office was the design architect for the Macquarie Street Wing. The Government Architects Office was again engaged in 2011 for planned renovations for the building resulting in a redesigned reading room and construction of a new learning space for education programs. Work commenced in 2011 and was completed in 2012.

=== Shakespeare Place ===
Shakespeare Place is the name of the public space in front of the sandstone facade of the Mitchell Library. As of 2026, it is dominated by roads to the Cahill Expressway. The open space predates the library and was previously the end of Fig Tree Avenue.

In an unknown year, the fence outside Shakespeare Place was widened to reduce the 'bottle neck' into the Domain.

With the construction of the Cahill Expressway in 1959, the statue of Shakespeare was moved and turned from east-facing to west-facing.

==== State Library Public Domain project ====
In September 2025, a redevelopment of the forecourt of the library was approved to proceed. The plans include the plan includes the realignment of Sir John Young Crescent and Hospital Road and nearly doubling the size of the forecourt.

Road realignment works include narrowing Shakespeare Place (the on/off ramp to the Eastern Distributor), redirecting Hospital Road east as it approaches Shakespeare Place, removal of slip lanes to and from Macquarie Street and Shakespeare Place, and footpath upgrades.

The original plans retain of 3 westbound off-ramp vehicle lanes ouf ot the 4 lanes between Shakespeare Place and Macquarie Street currently existing, with the same three lanes exiting the Eastern Distributor. The plans do not reduce the number of lanes entering the motorway.

As the realignment works involved a Declared Freeway, the works required Transport for NSW (TfNSW) consent. On 28 November 2024, TfNSW had completed exhibition and received 12 submissions. In feedback to the traffic modelling, Transurban stated that the reduction of traffic capacity on Shakespeare Place could result in severe adverse impacts and increased congestion along the Eastern Distributor, Cross City Tunnel, and Sir John Young Crescent.

After discussions between the applicant and TfNSW to determine a road design based on modelling, the plans were amended with a dedicated westbound left turn lane on Shakespeare Place into Macquarie Street. Transport for NSW supported the road realignment subject to amendments. Traffic forecasting indicated additional lanes would be required to support expected traffic flow.

The updated plans retain all westbound off-ramp vehicle lanes between Shakespeare Place and Macquarie Street as currently exist.

The works are included in the wider Macquarie Street East Precinct plans.

== Gallery ==
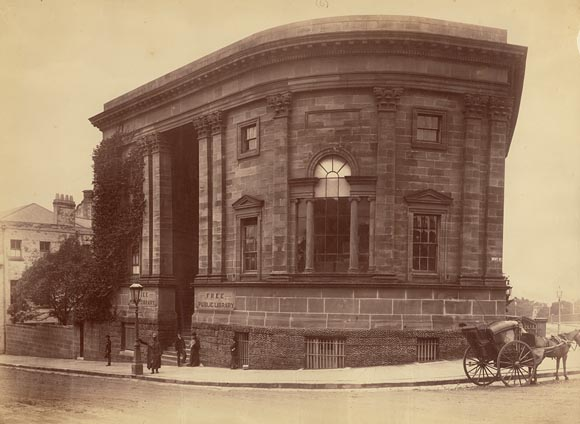
Free Public Library, 1877

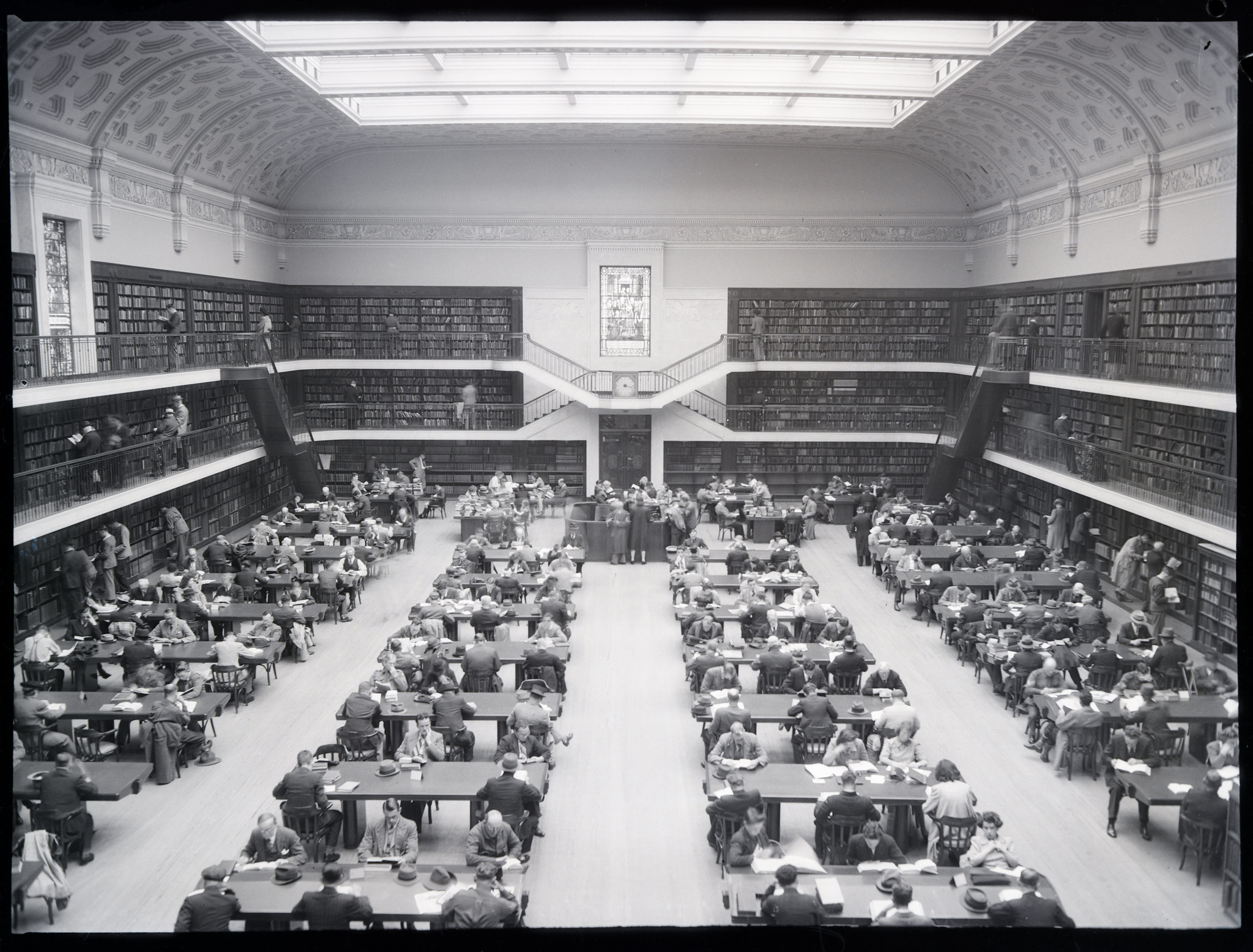
Main reading room, Mitchell Building, 1943

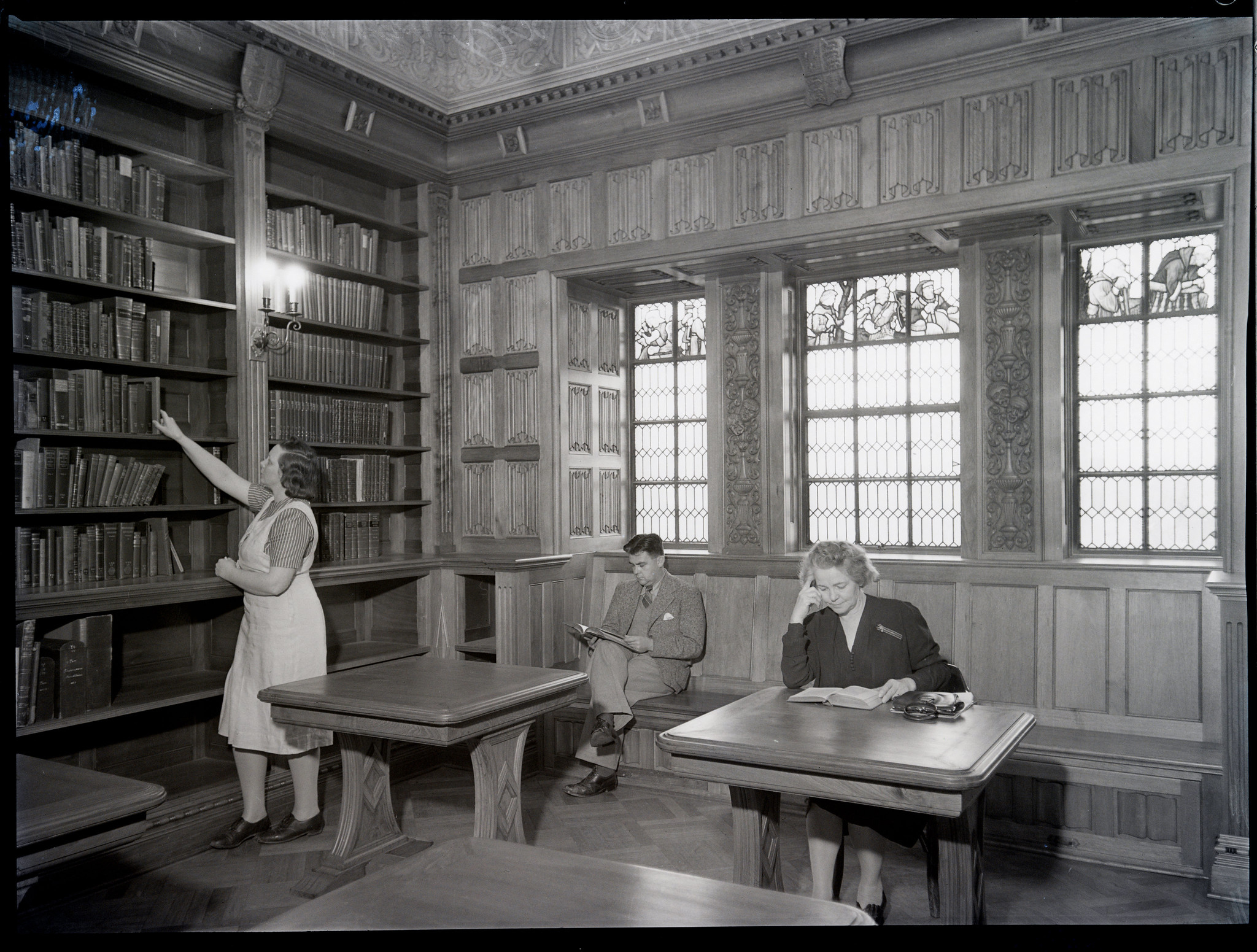
Shakespeare Room, Mitchell Building, 1943

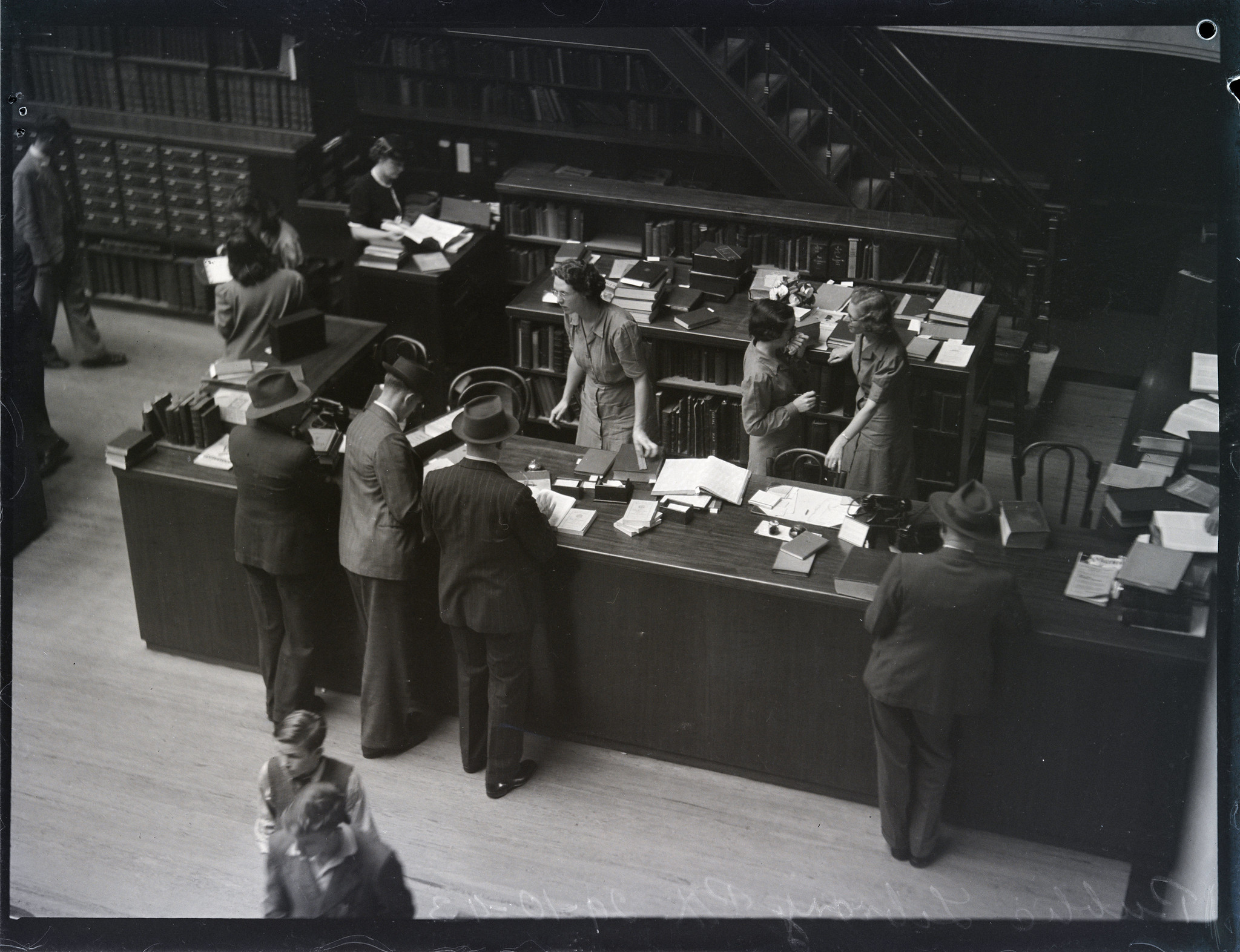
Library desk, Reading Room, Mitchell Building, 1943

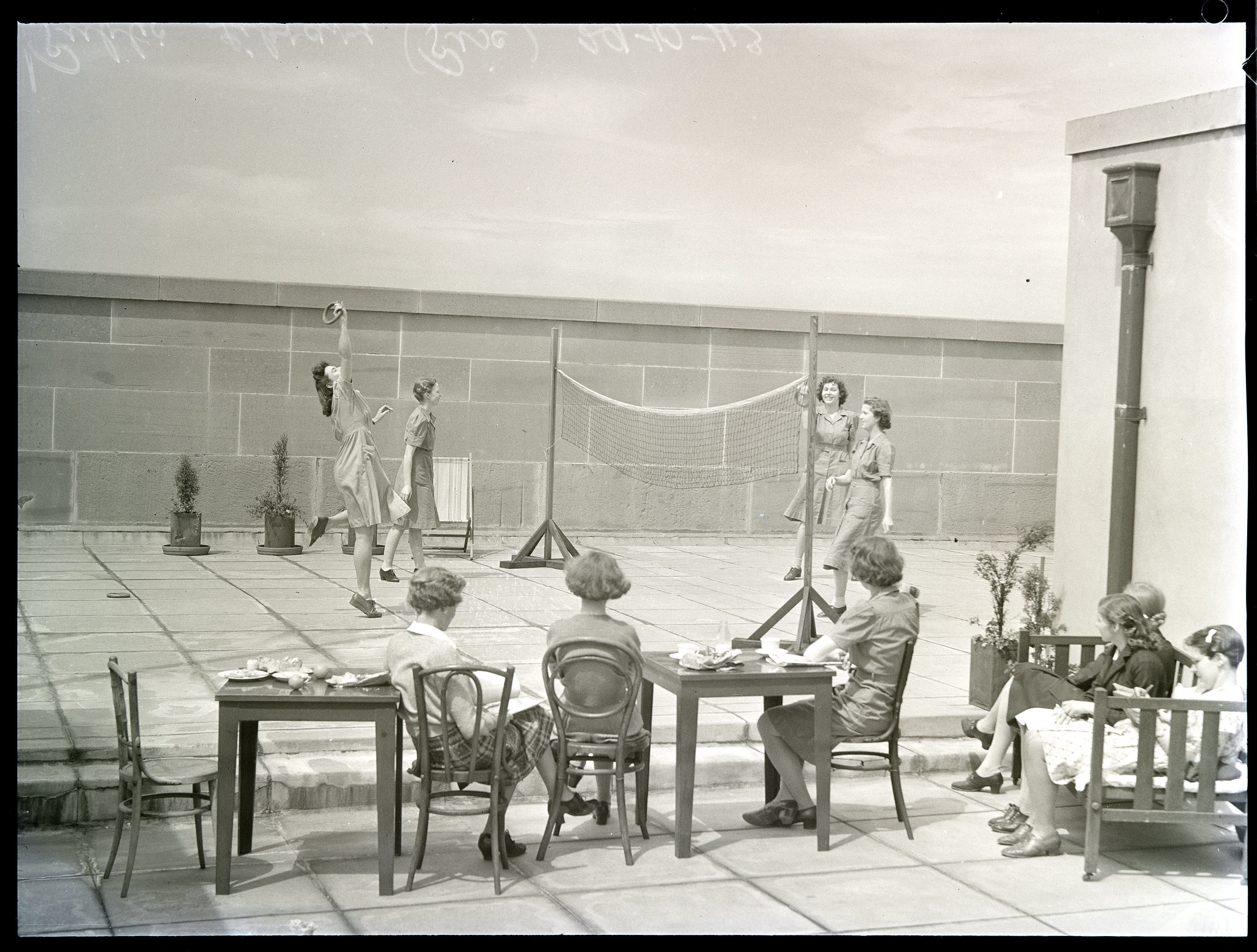
Staff on Roof, Mitchell Building, 1943

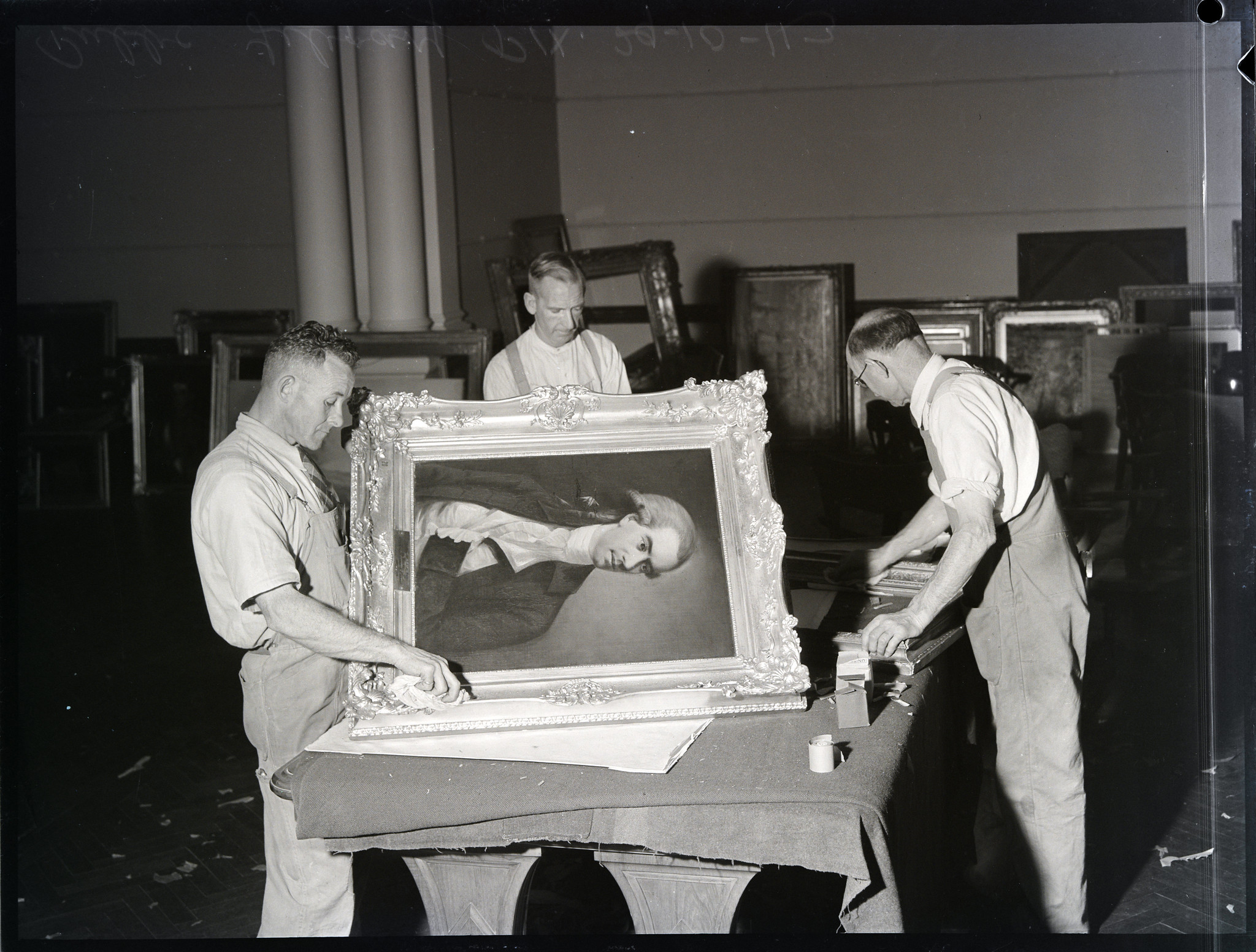
Painting conservators, Mitchell Building, 1943

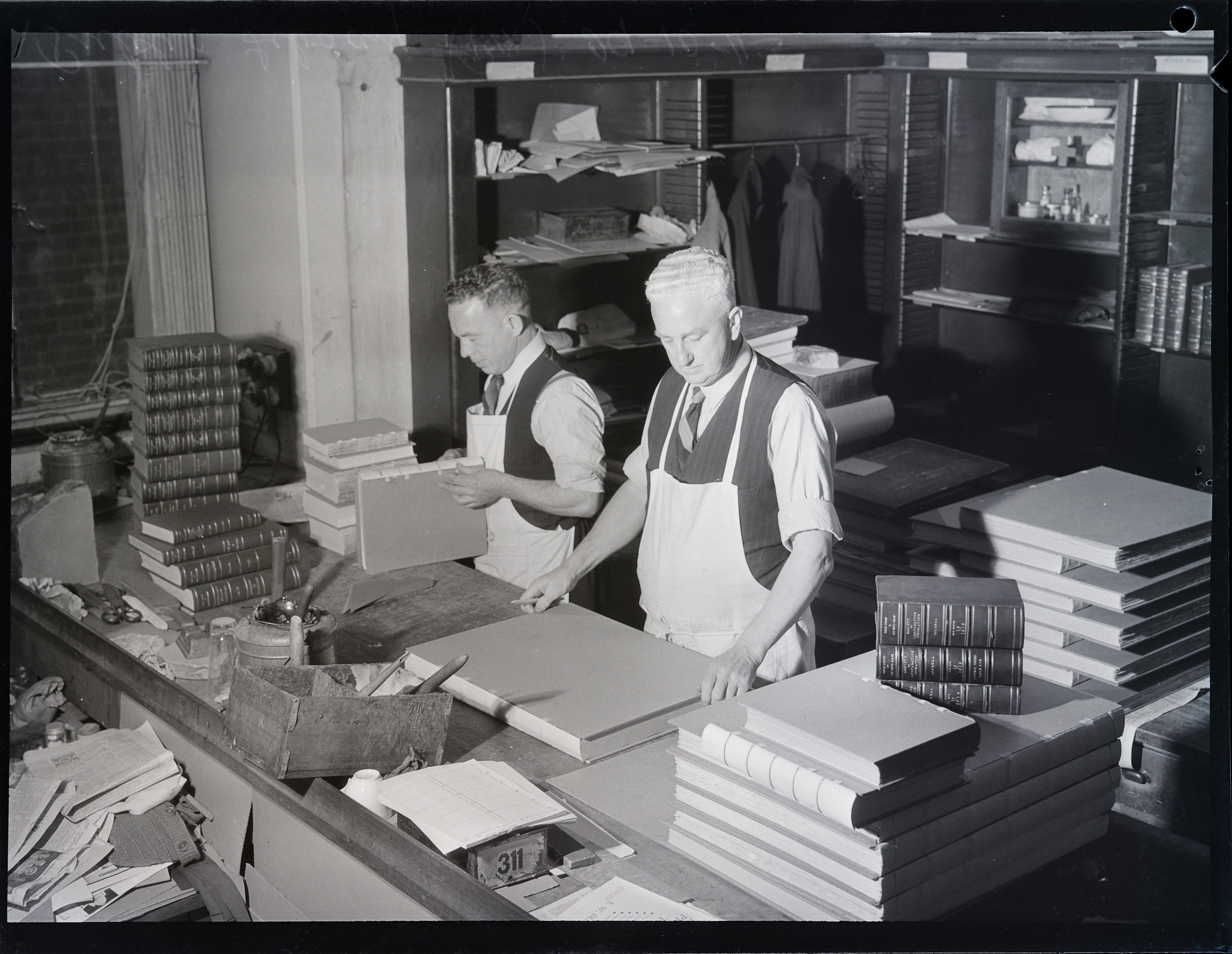
Book Conservators, Mitchell Building, 1943

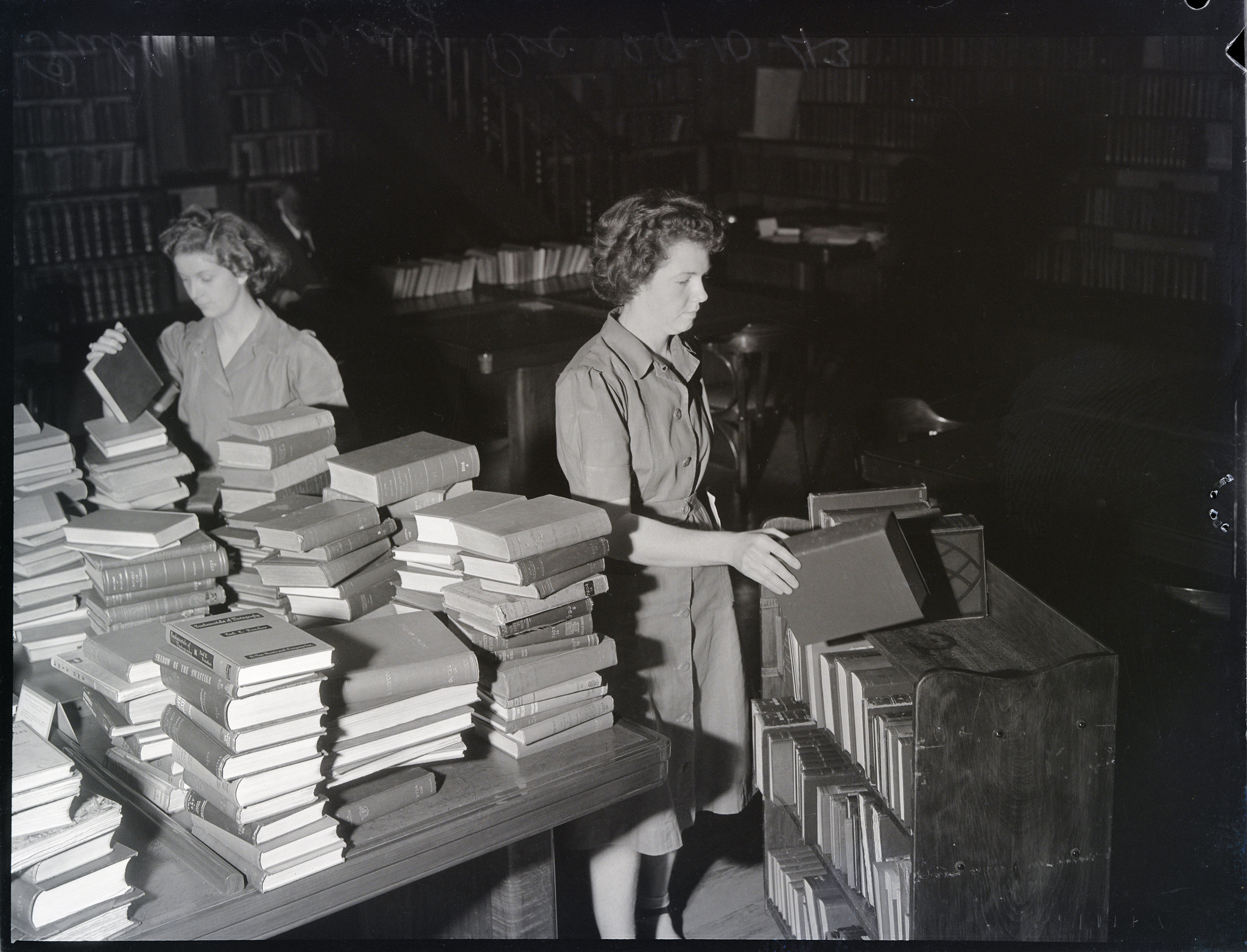
Books for lending library, Mitchell Building, 1943

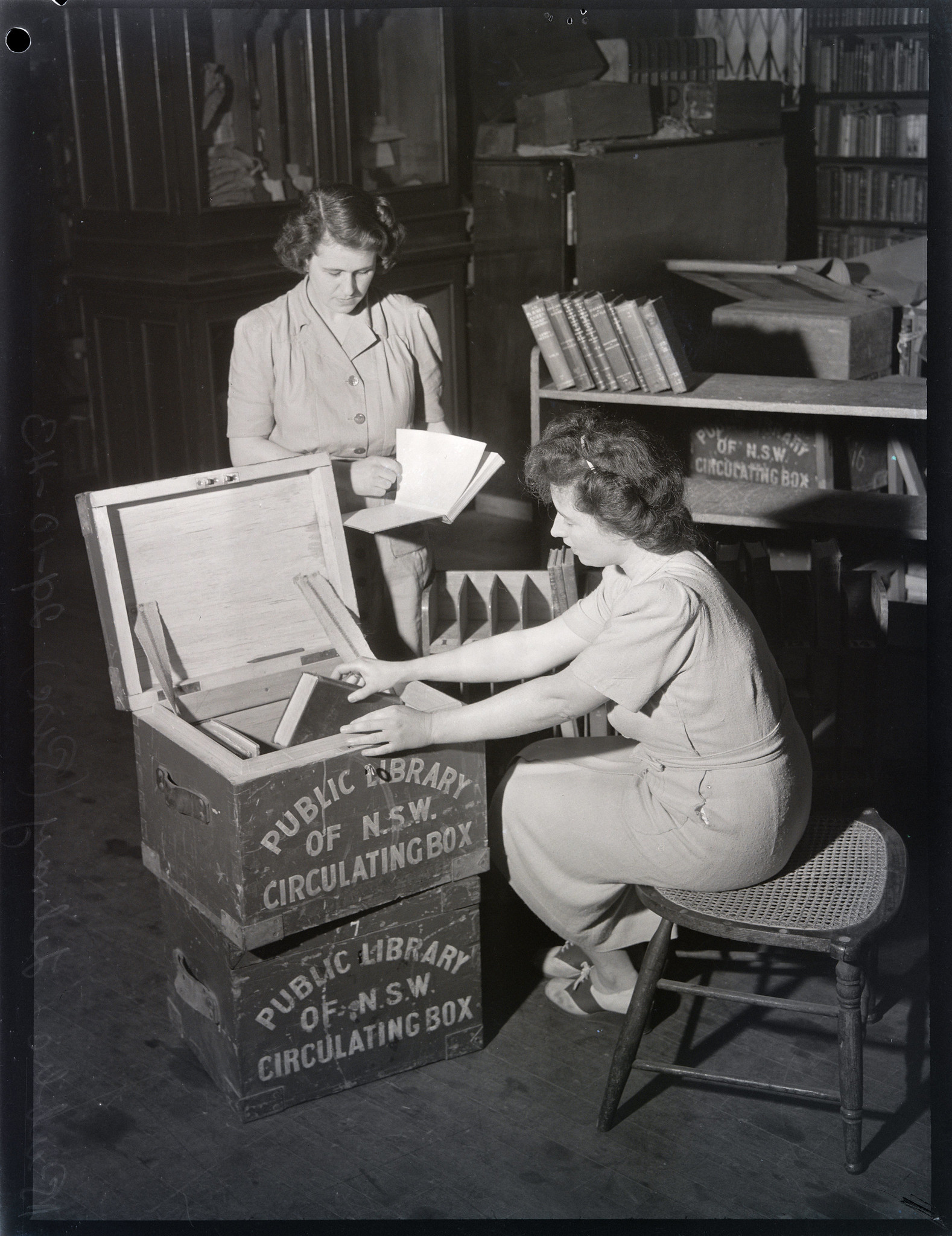
Boxing books for the Lending Library, Mitchell Building, 1943

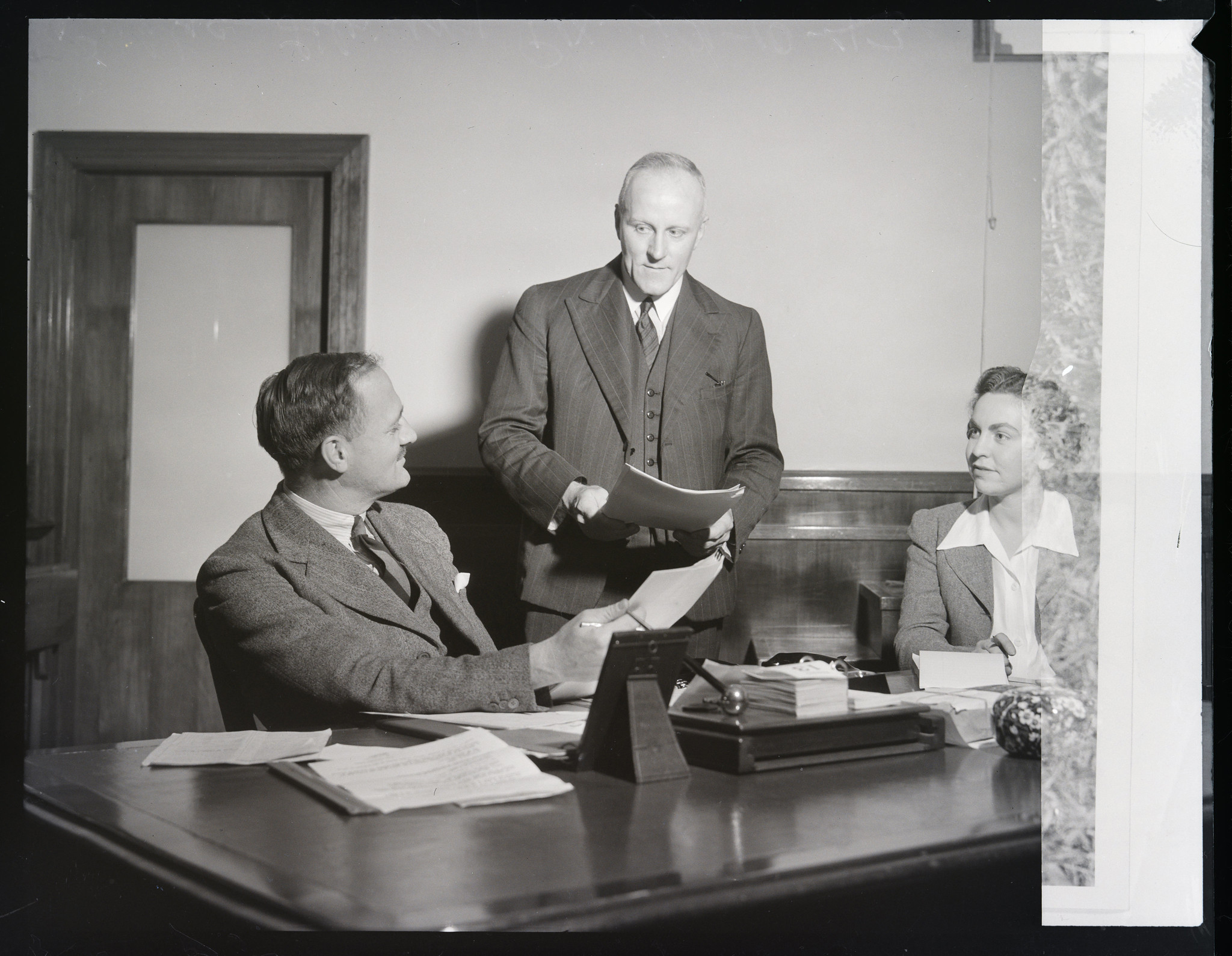
Mitchell Librarian, Mitchell Building, 1943

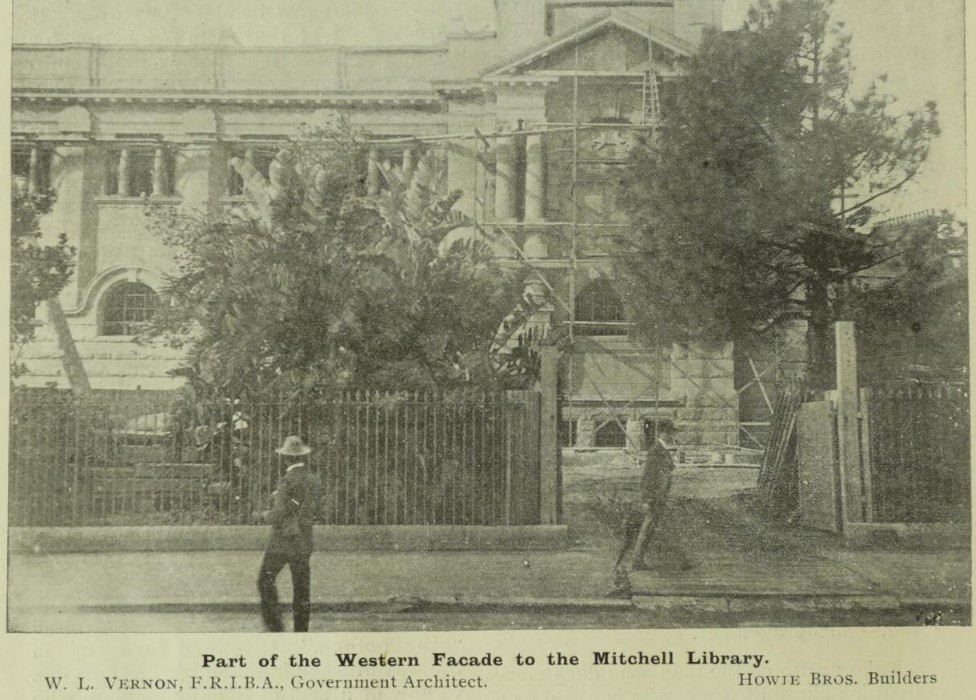
Mitchell library 1907

== Governance ==
The library is an agency of the Ministry of Arts in the New South Wales State Government.

=== Early Librarians and State Librarians ===
The role of the State Librarian is prescribed in the New South Wales Library Act 1939, ss 7a. The State Librarian is the Secretary of the Library Council of New South Wales. There have been 20 people appointed to manage the collections since 1827 but 1869 marks the first appointment by the NSW State Government after acquiring the Library from private hands.

Ordinal	Name	Title	Term start	Term end	Time in office	Notes
1	Peter Cooke	Librarian	1827	1829	2 years	
2	Charles Henderson	Librarian	1829	1829	1 year	
3	Thomas Connolly	Librarian	1831	1839	8 years	
4	The Hon. John Fairfax	Librarian	1839	1841	3 years	
5	P. J. Elliott	Librarian	1841	1865	24 years	
6	D. R. Hawley	Librarian	1865	1869	4 years	
7	Robert Cooper Walker	Principal Librarian	1869	1893	24 years	
8	Henry Charles Lennox Anderson	Principal Librarian	1893	1906	13 years	
9	Frank Murcott Bladen	Principal Librarian	1907	1912	5 years	
10	William Herbert Ifould OBE	Principal Librarian	1912	1942	30 Years	
11	John Wallace Metcalfe	Principal Librarian	1942	1959	17 years	
12	Gordon Dalyell Richardson OBE	Principal Librarian	1959	1973	14 years	
13	Russell Fletcher Doust	State Librarian	1973	1987	14 years	
14	Alison Laura Crook AO	State Librarian	1987	1995	8 years	
15	Dagmar Schmidmaier AM	State Librarian and Chief Executive	1995	2006	11 years	
16	Regina Anne Sutton	State Librarian and Chief Executive	2006	2010	4 years	
17	Alex Byrne	State Librarian and Chief Executive	2011	2016	5 years	
18	Lucy Milne	State Librarian and Chief Executive (Acting)	2016	2017	1 year	
19	John Vallance	State Librarian and Chief Executive	August 2017	November 2023	6 years	
20	Caroline Butler-Bowdon	State Librarian and Chief Executive	November 2023	Incumbent	2–3 years	

=== Mitchell Librarian ===
Mitchell's bequest stipulated that a position be created called the Mitchell Librarian. There have been 10 Mitchell Librarians since 1909:

Ordinal	Name	Title	Term start	Term end	Time in office	Notes
1	Hugh Wright	Mitchell Librarian	1909	1932	22–23 years	
2	Ida Leeson	Mitchell Librarian	1932	1946	13–14 years	
3	Phyllis Mander-Jones	Mitchell Librarian	1947	1957	9–10 years	
4	Gordon Dalyell Richardson^{[note 3]}	Mitchell Librarian	1958	1973	14–15 years	
5	Suzanne Mourot	Mitchell Librarian	1973	1979	5–6 years	
6	Baiba Berzins	Mitchell Librarian	1980	1987	6–7 years	
7	Margy Burn	Mitchell Librarian	1988	1993	4–5 years	
8	Alan Ventress	Mitchell Librarian	1993	2001	7–8 years	
9	Elizabeth Ellis	Mitchell Librarian	2001	2008	6–7 years	
10	Richard Neville	Mitchell Librarian	2008	Incumbent	17–18 years	

== Heritage listing ==
As of 21 March 2001, the public library of New South Wales houses a public facility initiated in 1869 and is one of the most important libraries in Australia. It was the second purpose-built library and the only remaining public library in Sydney dating from the early twentieth century. The building is still in use and has a lengthy association with several historically important persons such as Government Architect WL Vernon. It is significant for the prominent position it occupies at the termination of one of the most historically important streetscapes in Australia. The building is of aesthetic significance reflecting important stylistic influences on the architecture of the twentieth century. The library is a recognised symbol in Sydney and has had a long association with the provision of library services to the local and regional community of New South Wales. The development and interior layout of the progressive stages of the building reflect the changing attitudes to library planning theory. It is significant as one of the only Government buildings in the Federation Academic Classical styles. Only two of these are cultural buildings, the other being the Art Gallery of NSW.

State Library of New South Wales building was listed on the New South Wales State Heritage Register on 2 April 1999 having satisfied the following criteria.

The place is important in demonstrating the course, or pattern, of cultural or natural history in New South Wales.

The Mitchell Wing has been in continuous use as a public library since its completion in 1907. The building is the second purpose-built library in Sydney, and the earliest remaining. The Mitchell Wing is specifically associated with a number of prominent Sydney residents who have acted as benefactors, librarians, architects and craftsmen on the building. The bequests of three people, namely Edward Wise, David Scott Mitchell and William Dixson formed the basis of the collections. The Mitchell Wing houses a unique collection of Australiana and reference material held in Trust by the State Library of New South Wales for the general public. The building is closely associated with the development of the NSW Government Architect's Office and particularly with the work of Walter Liberty Vernon, Richard McDonald Seymour Wells, Cobden Parkes and Edward Herbert Farmer.

The place has a strong or special association with a particular community or cultural group in New South Wales for social, cultural or spiritual reasons.

The building, as the repository of a unique collection of Australiana, is crucial to the community's sense of place. The importance of the building to the community is demonstrated in part by its completion in the early 1940s when other public works had been severely reduced by World War II. The inclusion of the Mitchell Wing on a number of Commonwealth, State and Local heritage registers indicates the value placed on the building by the community.

The place has potential to yield information that will contribute to an understanding of the cultural or natural history of New South Wales.

The original Mitchell Stack of steel and glass was regarded as highly innovative at the time of its construction. The two-storey stack area is now a unique example of a highly resolved design solution addressing structure, lighting and aesthetics. The building was the first public building in New South Wales, apart from hospitals, to have been fully air-conditioned.

The place possesses uncommon, rare or endangered aspects of the cultural or natural history of New South Wales.

The building is a rare example of the Academic Neo-Classical style used for public buildings in Sydney. It is also a rare building type within the state.

== See also ==
- Miles Franklin Award
- National Biography Award
- New South Wales Premier's Literary Awards
- New South Wales Premier's History Awards
- Russell Prize for Humour Writing
- Nita Kibble Literary Award
- Trim (cat), Matthew Flinders ship's cat; the library has a statue, memorial plaque and namesake cafe in his honour
- State Library of Victoria
- State Library of Western Australia
- State Library of South Australia
- State Library of Queensland
- State Library of Tasmania

== Notes ==
^1: The library's logo features the interrobang mark: ‽
^2: Duran Duran's photo sessions for Seven and the Ragged Tiger were held at the library in 1983.
^3: Richardson also concurrently held the role of Deputy Principal Librarian in 1958, and was then appointed Principal Librarian in 1959. When he retired in 1973, the Mitchell Librarian position was again separated from the position of Principal Librarian.
