= History of New South Wales =

The history of New South Wales refers to the history of the Australian state of New South Wales and the area's preceding Indigenous and British colonial societies. The Mungo Lake remains indicate occupation of parts of the New South Wales area by Indigenous Australians for at least 40,000 years. The British navigator James Cook became the first European to map the coast in 1770 and a First Fleet of British convicts followed to establish a penal colony at Sydney in 1788.

The colony established an autonomous parliamentary democracy from the 1850s and became a state of the Commonwealth of Australia in 1901 following a vote to federate with the other British colonies of Australia. Through the 20th century, the state was a major destination for increasingly diverse migrants from many nations. In the 21st century, the state is the most populous in Australia, and its capital, Sydney is a major financial capital and host to international cultural and economic events.

== Prehistory ==
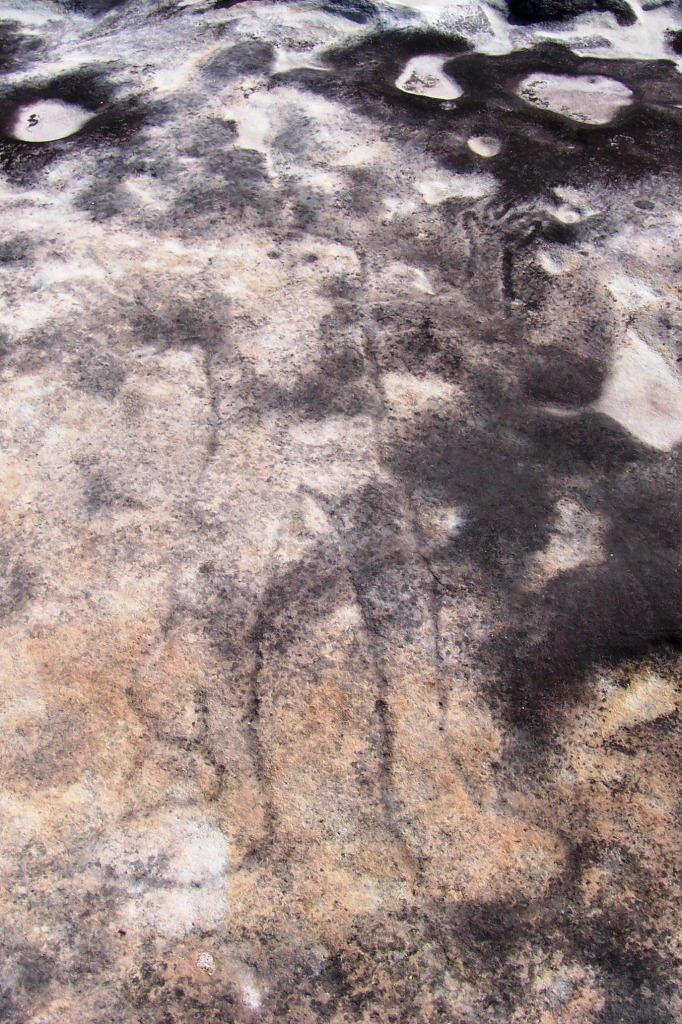
Petroglyph in Sydney's Ku-ring-gai Chase National Park

The ancestors of Aboriginal Australians moved into what is now the Australian continent about 50,000 to 65,000 years ago, during the last glacial period, arriving by land bridges and short sea crossings from what is now Southeast Asia. From the north, the population spread into a range of very different environments, including the future New South Wales. The oldest human remains found are at Lake Mungo in New South Wales, which have been dated to around 41,000 years ago. The site suggests one of the world's oldest known cremations, indicating early evidence for religious ritual among humans.

Examples of Aboriginal stone tools and Aboriginal art (often recording the stories of the Dreamtime religion) can be found throughout New South Wales, including modern Sydney. Aboriginal Australians have inhabited the Greater Sydney region for at least 30,000 years. The traditional custodians of the land on which modern Sydney stands are the clans of the Darug, Dharawal and Eora peoples.

== Arrival of Europeans ==
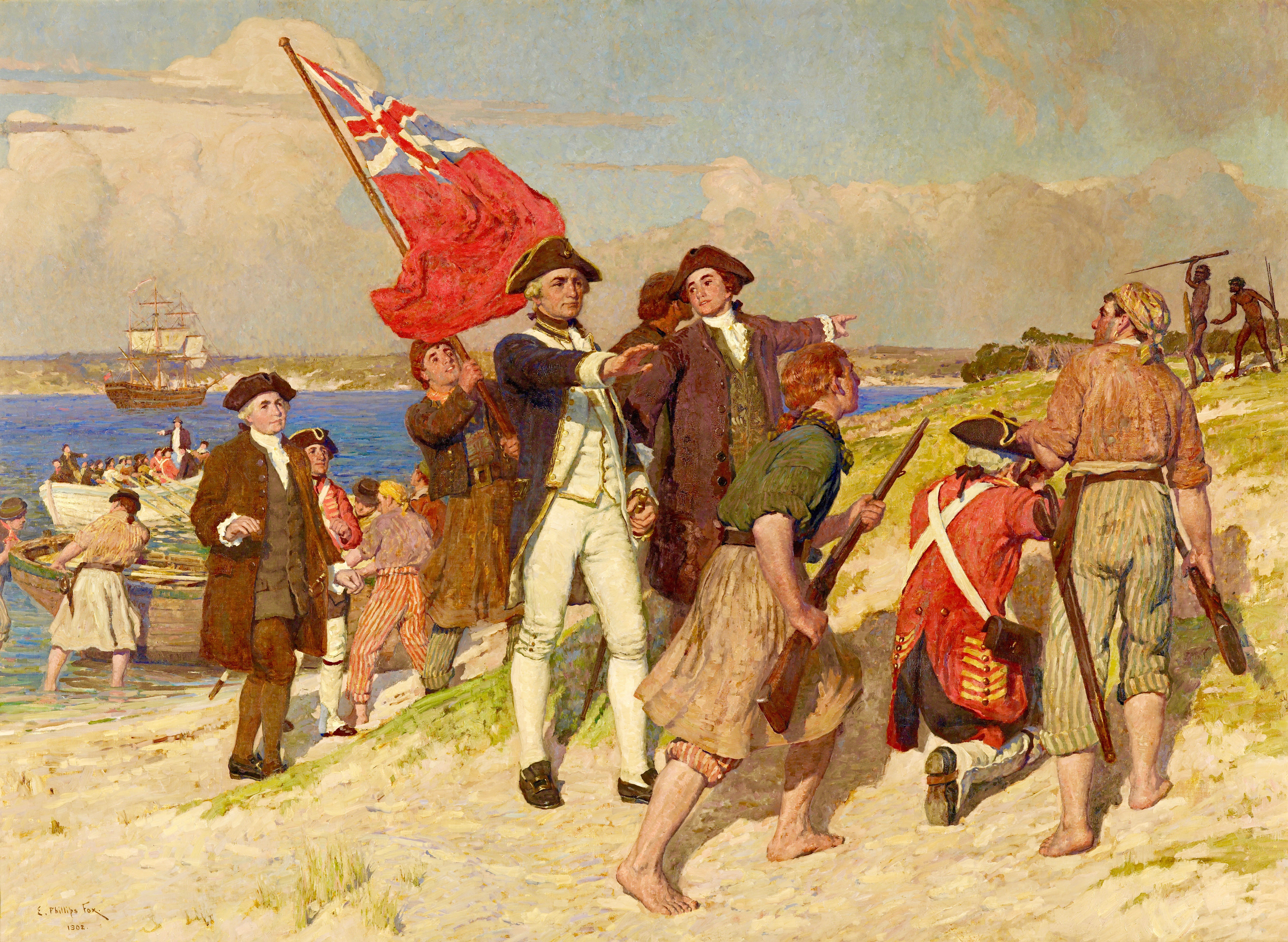
Landing of Lieutenant James Cook at Botany Bay, 29 April 1770 by E. Phillips Fox (1902)

=== James Cook and British colonisation ===
In 1769 Lieutenant James Cook, in command of HMS Endeavour, sailed to Tahiti to observe the transit of Venus. Cook also carried secret Admiralty instructions to locate the supposed Southern Continent. Unable to find this continent, Cook decided to survey the east coast of New Holland (now called Australia), the only major part of that continent that had not been charted by Dutch navigators.

On 19 April 1770, the Endeavour reached the east coast of New Holland and ten days later anchored at Botany Bay, so named because of the abundant flora discovered there by the ship's naturalists, Joseph Banks and Daniel Solander. Cook then sailed north, charting the coast to its northern extent. On 22 August, he claimed the entire coastline that he had just explored as British territory. Cook claimed the coast down to Latitude 38°S, and "all the Bays, Harbours Rivers and Islands situate upon the said coast [sic]." Contrary to his instructions, Cook did not gain the consent of the Aboriginal inhabitants. Cook originally named the land New Wales, but on his return voyage to Britain he settled on the name New South Wales.

In 1779, Banks recommended Botany Bay as a suitable site for a penal settlement. Under Banks's guidance, the American Loyalist James Matra produced a new plan for colonising New South Wales in 1783. Following an interview with Secretary of State Lord Sydney in 1784, Matra amended his proposal to include convicts as settlers, considering that the move would benefit both "Economy to the Publick, & Humanity to the Individual". In August 1786, the Pitt government announced its intention to send convicts to Botany Bay.

=== 1788: Establishment of the colony ===
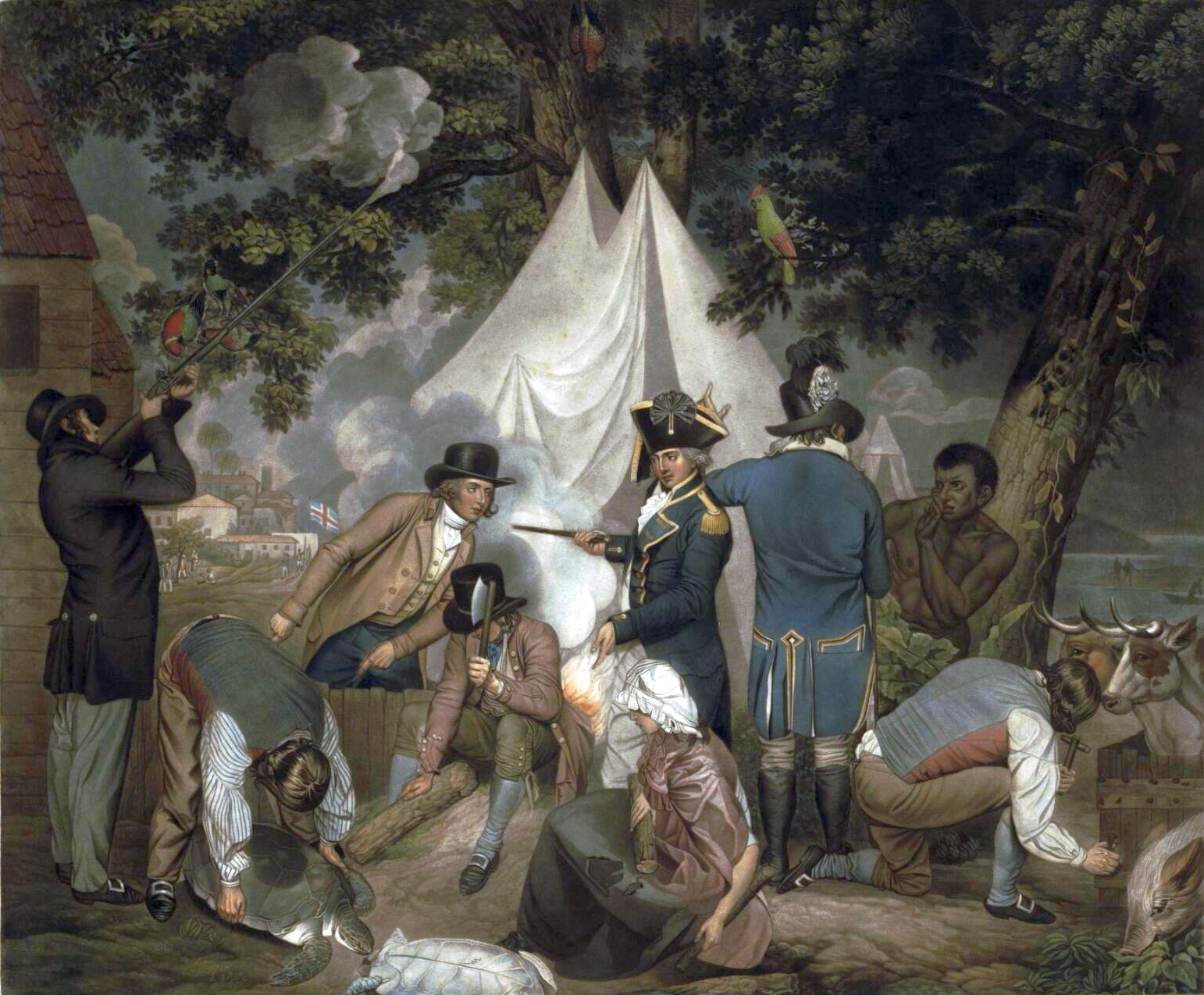
Founding of the settlement of Port Jackson at Botany Bay in New South Wales in 1788, by Thomas Gosse (1799)

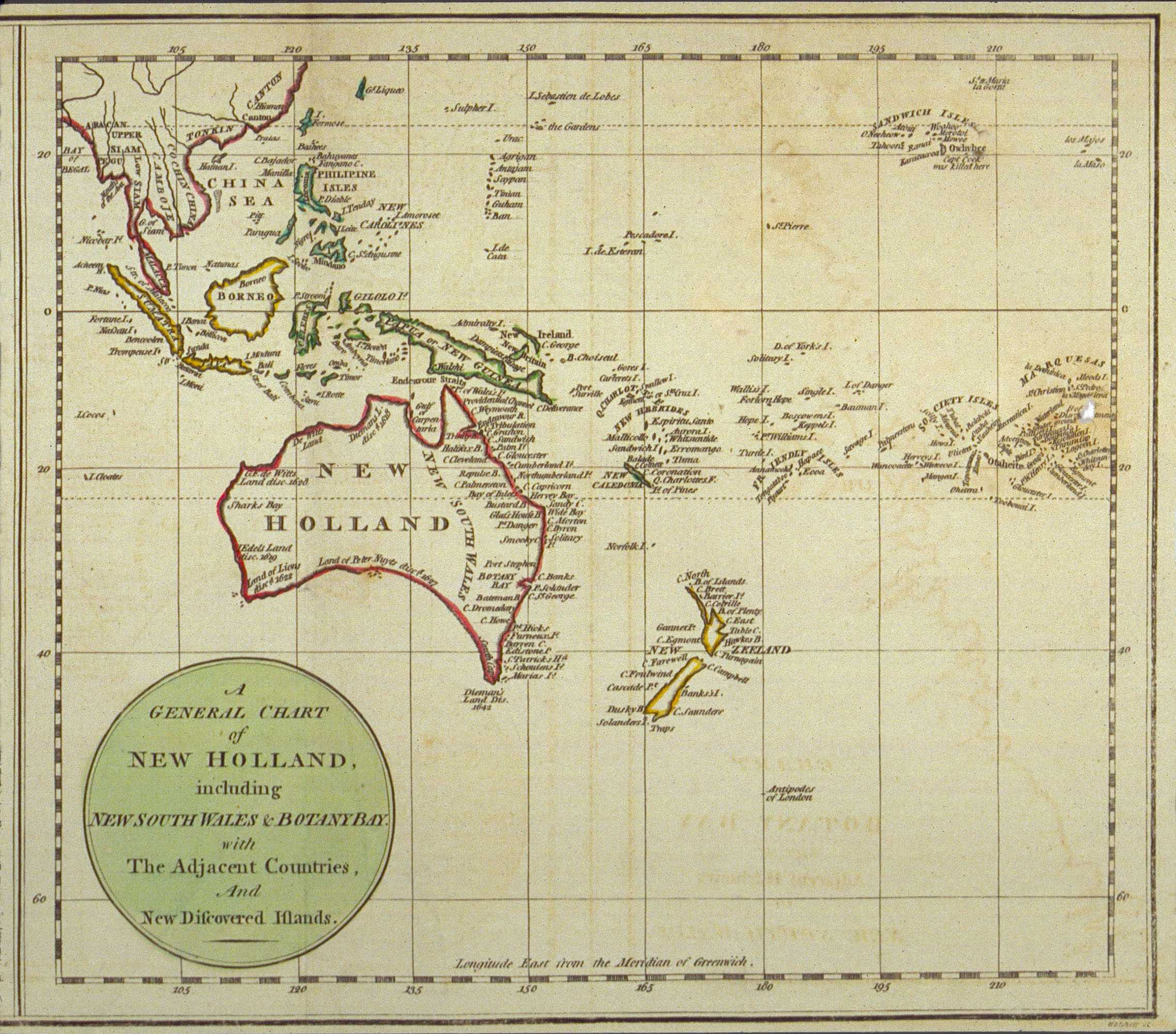
A General Chart of New Holland including New South Wales & Botany Bay with The Adjacent Countries and New Discovered Lands, published in An Historical Narrative of the Discovery of New Holland and New South Wales, London, Fielding and Stockdale, November 1786

The colony of New South Wales was established with the arrival of the First Fleet of 11 vessels under the command of Captain Arthur Phillip in January 1788. It consisted of more than a thousand settlers, including 778 convicts (192 women and 586 men). A few days after arrival at Botany Bay the fleet moved to the more suitable Port Jackson where a settlement was established at Sydney Cove on 26 January 1788. The colony was formally proclaimed by Governor Phillip on 7 February 1788 at Sydney. Sydney Cove offered a fresh water supply and a safe harbour, which Phillip described as being, 'with out exception the finest Harbour in the World [...] Here a Thousand Sail of the Line may ride in the most perfect Security'.

The territory of New South Wales claimed by Britain included all of Australia eastward of the meridian of 135° East. This included more than half of mainland Australia. The claim also included "all the Islands adjacent in the Pacific" between the latitudes of Cape York and the southern tip of Van Diemen's Land (Tasmania). In 1817, the British government withdrew the extensive territorial claim over the South Pacific, passing an act specifying that Tahiti, New Zealand and other islands of the South Pacific were not within His Majesty's dominions. However, it is unclear whether the claim ever extended to the current islands of New Zealand.

Governor Phillip was vested with complete authority over the inhabitants of the colony. Enlightened for his Age, Phillip's personal intent was to establish harmonious relations with local Aboriginal people and try to reform as well as discipline the convicts of the colony. Phillip and several of his officers—most notably Watkin Tench—left behind journals and accounts of which tell of immense hardships during the first years of settlement. Often Phillip's officers despaired for the future of New South Wales. Early efforts at agriculture were fraught and supplies from overseas were scarce. Between 1788 and 1792 about 3,546 male and 766 female convicts were landed at Sydney—many "professional criminals" with few of the skills required for the establishment of a colony. Many new arrivals were also sick or unfit for work and the conditions of healthy convicts only deteriorated with hard labour and poor sustenance in the settlement. The food situation reached crisis point in 1790 and the Second Fleet which finally arrived in June 1790 had lost a quarter of its 'passengers' through sickness, while the condition of the convicts of the Third Fleet appalled Phillip. From 1791, however, the more regular arrival of ships and the beginnings of trade lessened the feeling of isolation and improved supplies.

Phillip sent exploratory missions in search of better soils and fixed on the Parramatta region as a promising area for expansion and moved many of the convicts from late 1788 to establish a small township, which became the main centre of the colony's economic life, leaving Sydney Cove as an important port and focus of social life. Poor equipment and unfamiliar soils and climate continued to hamper the expansion of farming from Farm Cove to Parramatta and Toongabbie, but a building programme, assisted by convict labour, advanced steadily. Between 1788 and 1792, convicts and their gaolers made up the majority of the population—but after this, a population of emancipated convicts began to grow who could be granted land and these people pioneered a non-government private sector economy and were later joined by soldiers whose military service had expired—and finally, free settlers who began arriving from Britain. Governor Phillip departed the colony for England on 11 December 1792, with the new settlement having survived near starvation and immense isolation for four years.

For the next 40 years the history of New South Wales was identical to the history of Australia, since it was not until 1803 that any settlements were made outside the current boundaries of New South Wales, and these, at Hobart and Launceston in Van Diemen's Land (Tasmania), were at first dependencies of New South Wales. It was not until 1825 that Van Diemen's Land became a separate colony. Also that year, on 16 July, the border of New South Wales was set further west at the 129th meridian to encompass the short lived settlement on Melville Island. In 1829 this border became the border with Western Australia, which was proclaimed a colony.

The indigenous Australians or Aboriginal people had lived in what is now New South Wales for at least 50,000 years, making their living through hunting, gathering and fishing. The impact of European settlement on these people was immediate and devastating. They had no natural resistance to European diseases, and epidemics of measles and smallpox spread far ahead of the frontier of settlement, radically reducing population and fatally disrupting indigenous society. Although there was some resistance to European occupation, in general the indigenous people were evicted from their lands without difficulty. Dispossession, disease, violence and alcohol reduced them to a remnant within a generation in most areas.

Accounts of early encounters between Sydney's Aboriginal people and the British are provided by the author Watkin Tench, who was an officer on the First Fleet and the writer of one of the first works of literature about New South Wales. The colony struggled in its early days for economic self-sufficiency, since supplies from Britain were few and inadequate. The whaling industry provided some early revenue, but it was the development of the wool industry by John MacArthur and his wife Elizabeth Macarthur and other enterprising settlers that created the colony's first major export industry. For the first half of the 19th century New South Wales was essentially a sheep run, supported by the port of Sydney and a few subsidiary towns such as Newcastle (where a permanent settlement was established in 1804) and Bathurst (1815). Newcastle, north of Sydney, named after the English coal port city, was initially established as a severe punishment camp for troublesome convicts following the Castle Hill Rebellion but would grow to be a major industrial centre and the State's second largest city. The State's third city, Wollongong, south of Sydney, was founded in 1829 as an outpost for a contingent of soldiers sent in response to conflict between local Aboriginal people and the unruly timber-getters who had established themselves in the area. Agriculture soon established itself, dairy and coal mining had begun by the 1840s, and the city grew to become a major industrial centre. The Hawkesbury and Nepean Wars (1795–1816) were fought between the Kingdom of Great Britain and the Indigenous clans of the Hawkesbury and Nepean rivers.

Constitutionally, New South Wales was founded as an autocracy run by the Governor, although he nearly always exercised his powers within the restraints of British law. In practice the early Governors ruled by consent, with the advice of military officers, officials and leading settlers. The New South Wales Corps was formed in England in 1789 as a permanent regiment to relieve the marines who had accompanied the First Fleet. Officers of the Corps soon became involved in the corrupt and lucrative rum trade in the colony. In the Rum Rebellion of 1808, the Corps, working closely with the newly established wool trader John Macarthur, staged the only successful armed takeover of government in Australian history, deposing Governor William Bligh and instigating a brief period of military rule in the colony prior to the arrival from Britain of Governor Lachlan Macquarie in 1810.

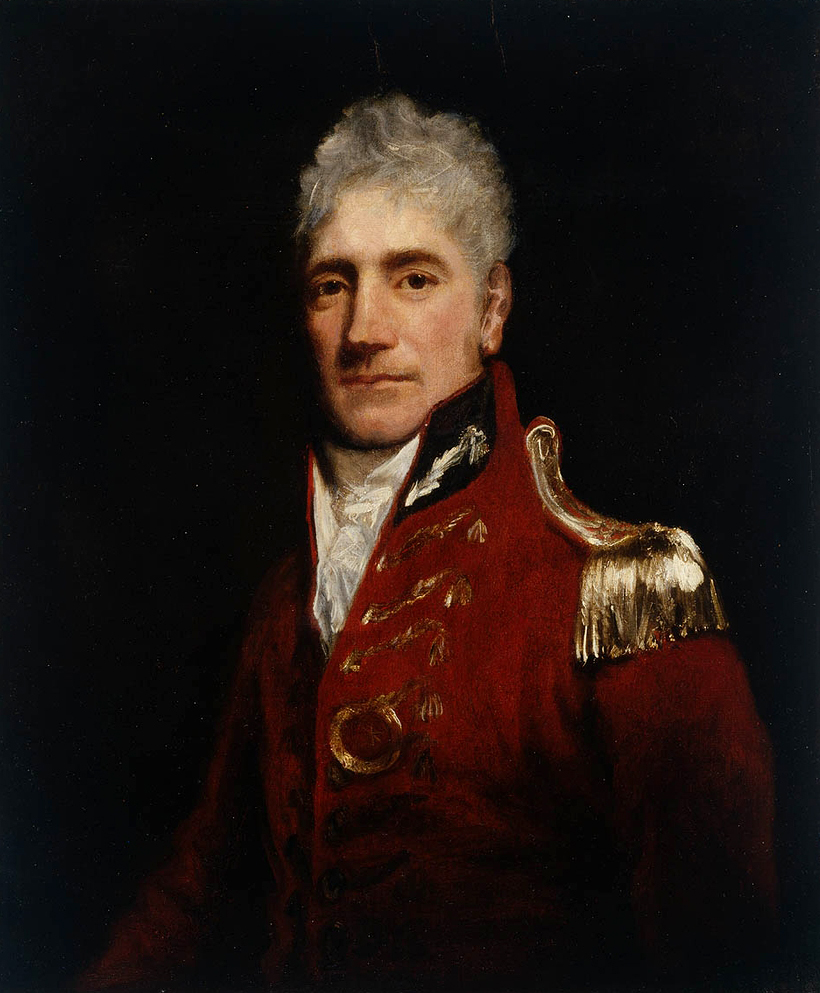
The 5th Governor of New South Wales, Lachlan Macquarie, was influential in establishing civil society in Australia

Macquarie served as the last autocratic Governor of New South Wales, from 1810 to 1821 and had a leading role in the social and economic development of New South Wales which saw it transition from a penal colony to a budding free society. He established public works, a bank, churches, and charitable institutions and sought good relations with the Aboriginal people. In 1813 he sent Blaxland, Wentworth and Lawson on an expedition across the Blue Mountains, where they found the great plains of the interior. Central, however to Macquarie's policy was his treatment of the emancipists, whom he decreed should be treated as social equals to free-settlers in the colony. Against opposition, he appointed emancipists to key government positions including Francis Greenway as colonial architect and William Redfern as a magistrate. London judged his public works to be too expensive and society was scandalised by his treatment of emancipists. His legacy lives on with Macquarie Street, Sydney bearing his name as the well as the New South Wales Parliament and various buildings designed during his tenure including the UNESCO listed Hyde Park Barracks.

In 1821 there were still only 36,000 Europeans in the colony. Although the number of free settlers began to increase rapidly after the end of the Napoleonic Wars in 1815, convicts were still 40% of the population in 1820, and it was not until the 1820s that free settlers began to occupy most of what is now rural New South Wales. An inland settlement was established at Bathurst, west of the Blue Mountains, on the banks of the Macquarie River. It was proclaimed a town in 1815 and properties across the plains began to support cattle and grow wheat, vegetables and fruit and produce fine wool for export to the knitting mills of industrial Britain. The period from 1820 to 1850 is regarded as the golden age of the squatters.

1825 saw the establishment of the New South Wales Legislative Council, Australia's oldest legislative body, as an appointed body to advise the Governor. In the same year trial by jury was introduced, ending the military's judicial power. In 1842 the Council was made partly elective, through the agitation of democrats like William Wentworth. This development was made possible by the abolition of transportation of convicts to New South Wales in 1840, by which time 150,000 convicts had been sent to Australia. After 1840 the settlers saw themselves as a free people and demanded the same rights they would have had in Britain.

== Development of the colony ==
=== Exploration ===
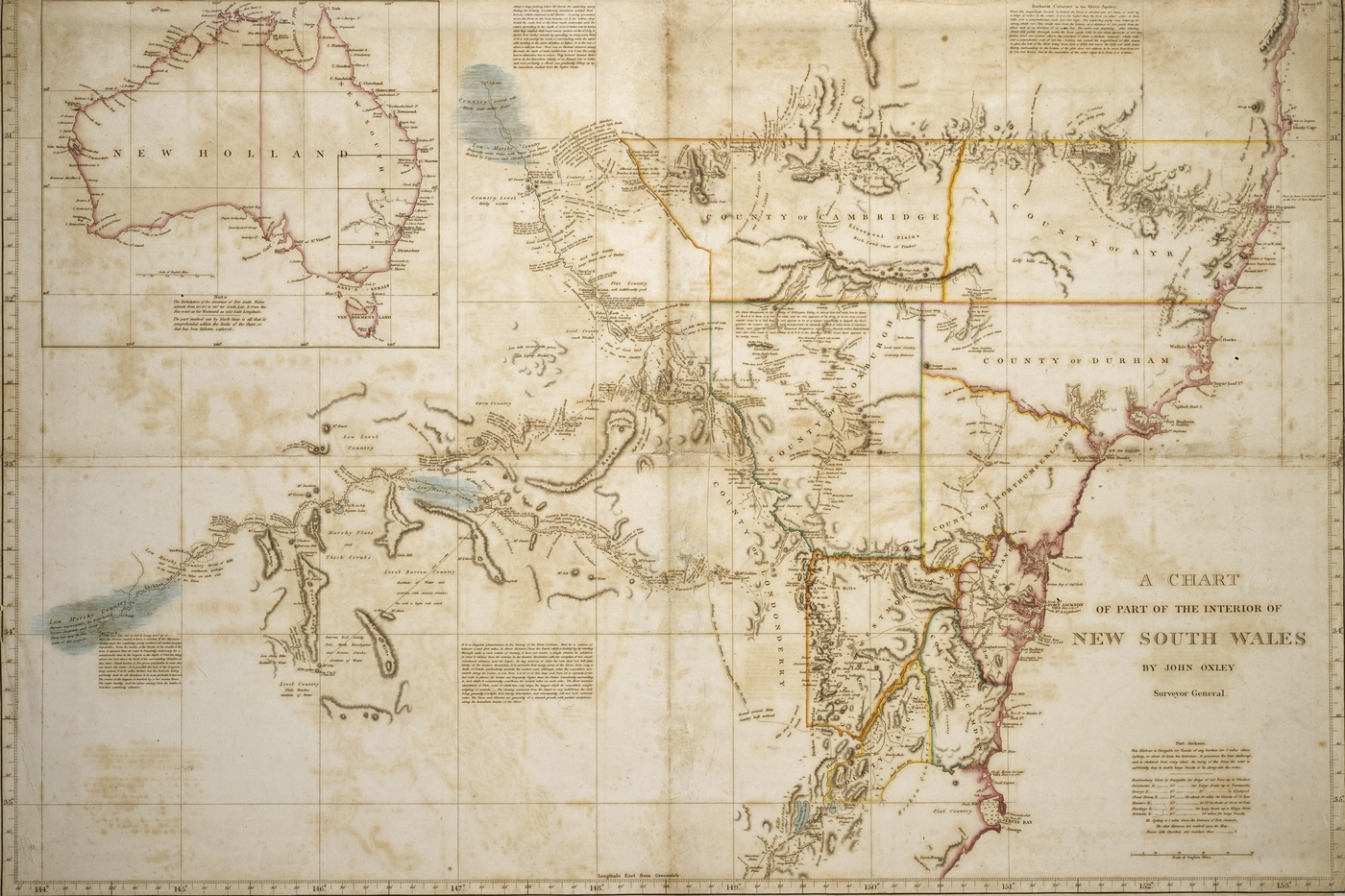
A chart of part of the interior of New South Wales by John Oxley, Surveyor General, 1822

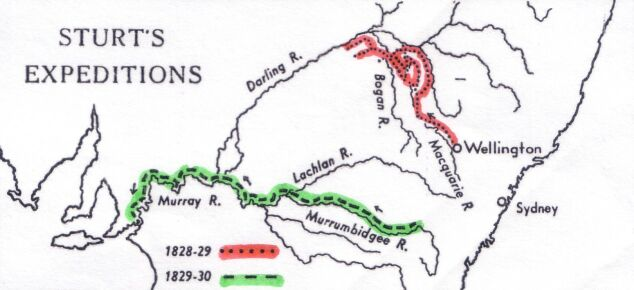
Early expeditions of Charles Sturt

In October 1795 George Bass and Matthew Flinders, accompanied by William Martin sailed the boat Tom Thumb out of Port Jackson to Botany Bay and explored the Georges River further upstream than had been done previously by the colonists. Their reports on their return led to the settlement of Banks' Town. In March 1796 the same party embarked on a second voyage in a similar small boat, which they also called the Tom Thumb. During this trip they travelled as far down the coast as Lake Illawarra, which they called Tom Thumb Lagoon. They discovered and explored Port Hacking. In 1798–99, Bass and Flinders set out in a sloop and circumnavigated Tasmania, thus proving it to be an island.

Aboriginal guides and assistance in the European exploration of the colony were common and often vital to the success of missions. In 1801–02 Matthew Flinders in The Investigator lead the first circumnavigation of Australia. Aboard ship was the Aboriginal explorer Bungaree, of the Sydney district, who became the first person born on the Australian continent to circumnavigate the Australian continent. Previously, the famous Bennelong and a companion had become the first people born in the area of New South Wales to sail for Europe, when, in 1792 they accompanied Governor Phillip to England and were presented to King George III.

In 1813, Gregory Blaxland, William Lawson and William Wentworth succeeded in crossing the formidable barrier of forested gulleys and sheer cliffs presented by the Blue Mountains, west of Sydney, by following the ridges instead of looking for a route through the valleys. At Mount Blaxland they looked out over "enough grass to support the stock of the colony for thirty years", and expansion of the British settlement into the interior could begin.

In 1824 the Governor, Sir Thomas Brisbane, commissioned Hamilton Hume and former Royal Navy Captain William Hovell to lead an expedition to find new grazing land in the south of the colony, and also to find an answer to the mystery of where New South Wales's western rivers flowed. Over 16 weeks in 1824–25, Hume and Hovell journeyed to Port Phillip and back. They made many important discoveries including the Murray River (which they named the Hume), many of its tributaries, and good agricultural and grazing lands between Gunning, New South Wales and Corio Bay, Victoria.

Charles Sturt led an expedition along the Macquarie River in 1828 and discovered the Darling River. A theory had developed that the inland rivers of New South Wales were draining into an inland sea. Leading a second expedition in 1829, Sturt followed the Murrumbidgee River into a 'broad and noble river', the Murray River, which he named after Sir George Murray, secretary of state for the colonies. His party then followed this river to its junction with the Darling River, facing two threatening encounters with local Aboriginal people along the way. Sturt continued down river on to Lake Alexandrina, where the Murray meets the sea in what is now South Australia. Suffering greatly, the party had to then row back upstream hundreds of kilometres for the return journey.

Surveyor General Sir Thomas Mitchell conducted a series of expeditions from the 1830s to 'fill in the gaps' left by these previous expeditions. He was meticulous in seeking to record the original Aboriginal place names around the colony, for which reason the majority of place names to this day retain their Aboriginal titles.

In 1836 a new colony of South Australia was established, and its territory separated from New South Wales.

The Polish scientist/explorer Count Paul Edmund Strzelecki conducted surveying work in the Australian Alps in 1839 and became the first European to ascend Australia's highest peak, which he named Mount Kosciuszko in honour of the Polish patriot Tadeusz Kościuszko.

=== Gold Rush ===
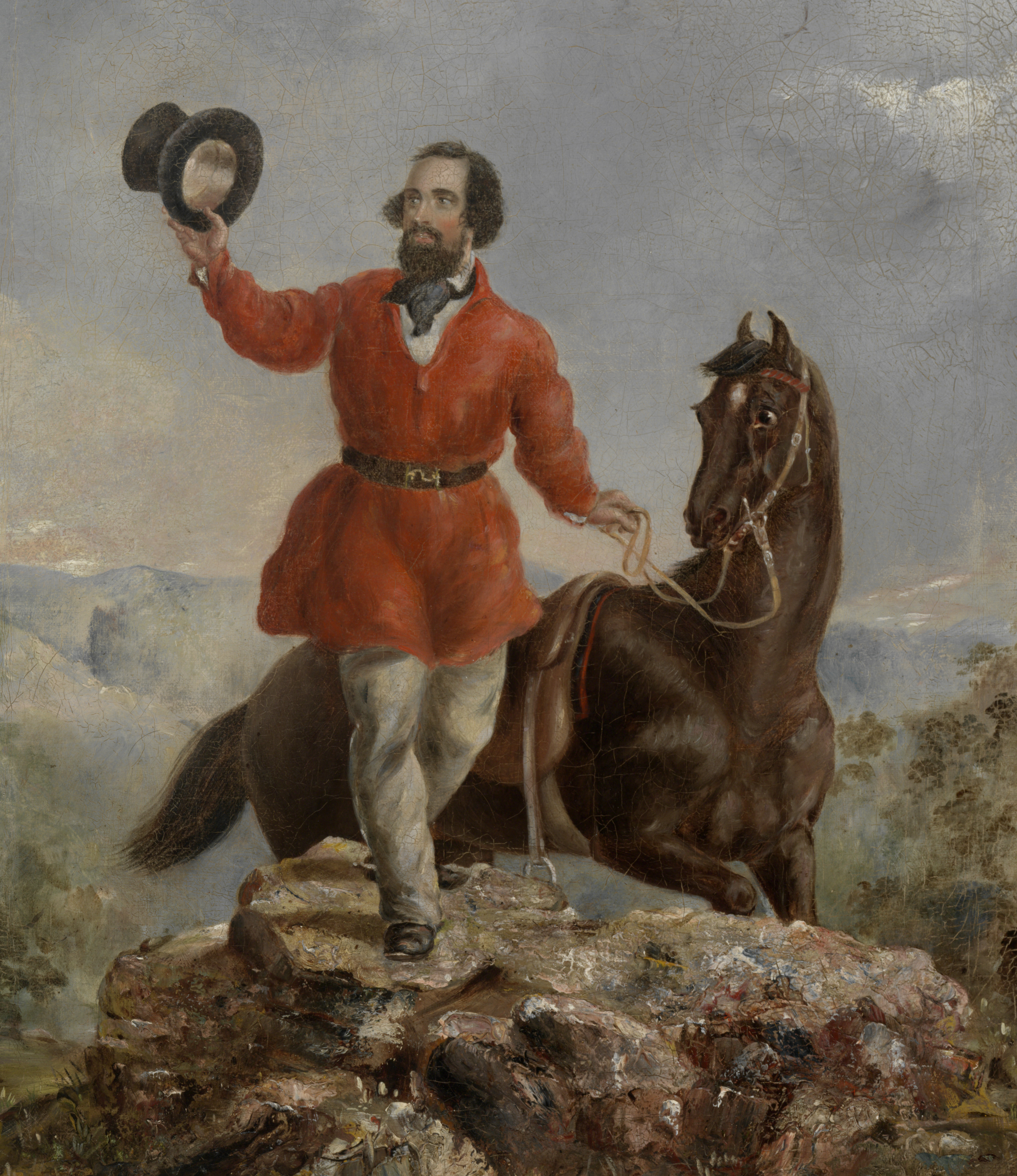
Mr E.H. Hargraves, The Gold Discoverer of Australia, returning the salute of the gold miners - Thomas Tyrwhitt Balcombe, 1851

A golden age of a new kind began in 1851 with the announcement of the discovery of payable gold at Ophir near Bathurst by Edward Hargraves. In that year New South Wales had about 200,000 people, a third of them within a day's ride of Sydney, the rest scattered along the coast and through the pastoral districts, from the Port Phillip District in the south to Moreton Bay in the north. The gold rushes of the 1850s brought a huge influx of settlers, although initially the majority of them went to the richest gold fields at Ballarat and Bendigo, in the Port Phillip District, which in 1851 was separated to become the colony of Victoria.

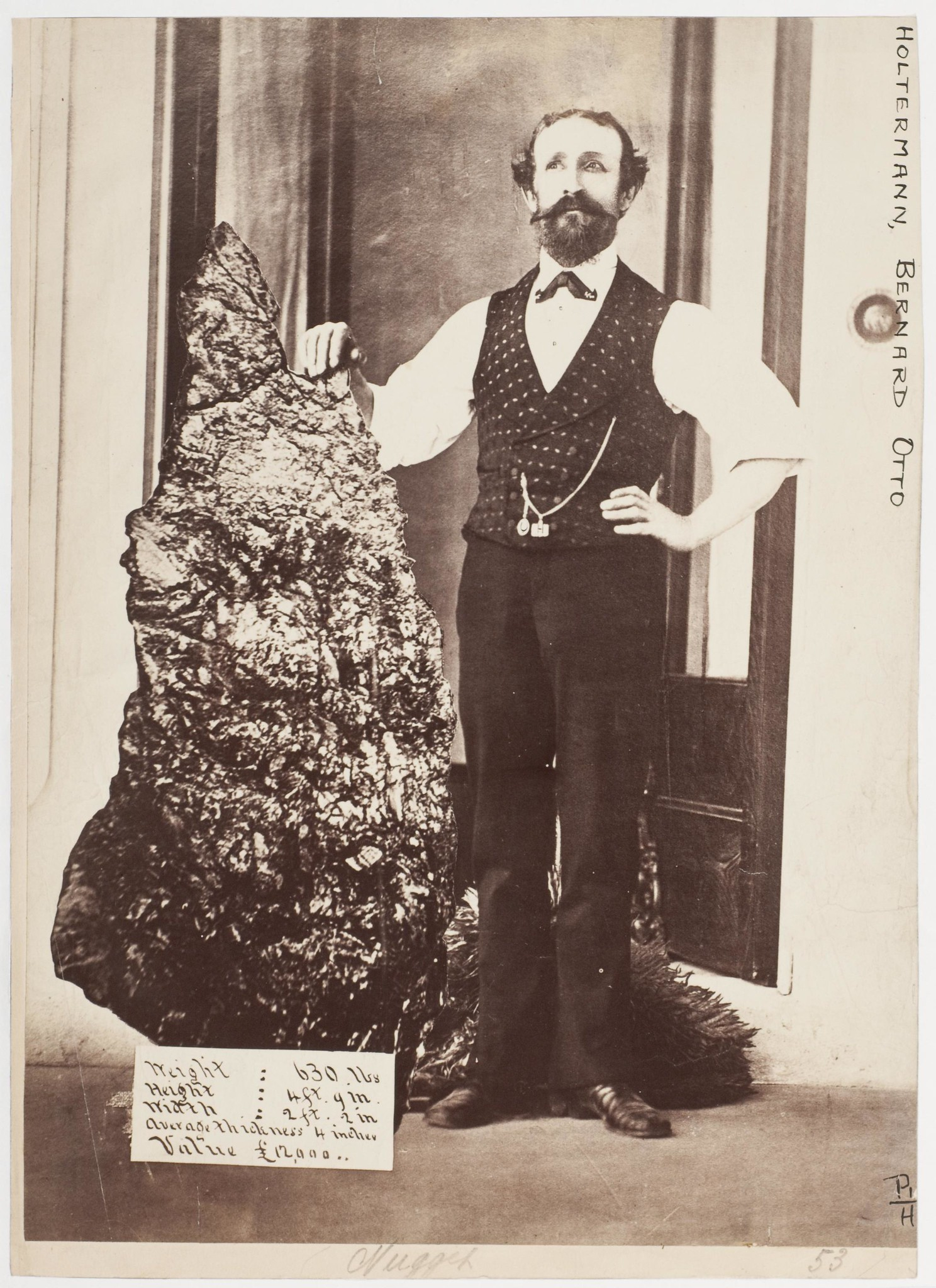
A 630 lb gold specimen from Hill End, unearthed in 1872

Hill End, also near Bathurst NSW was a locality that grew, boomed and faded with the New South Wales Gold Rush. Called Bald Hills in 1850, Forbes in 1860 and finally Hill End in 1862, it was part of the Tambaroora district. At its peak, its population was 7,000. Completely reliant on mining, the town's decline was dramatic once the gold ran out. Hill End is famed for the unearthing of the Holtermann Specimen (also known as the Beyers-Holtermann Specimen), being the largest single mass of gold ever discovered in the world, a record that stands today. Found in 1872 at the Star Hope Mine, this single mass of quartz and gold weighed 630 pounds (290 kg) and when crushed produced an estimated 3,000 troy ounces (210 pounds; 93 kilograms) of gold, thus holding more processed gold than from the largest nugget ever found, that being the Welcome Stranger from the Victorian Goldfields. Holtermann recognising the significance of the find attempted to preserve it by buying it from the Company of which he was one of a number of directors. His efforts were in vain. It is reported that a larger mass was discovered a few days later in the same mine but was broken up underground.

Victoria soon had a larger population than New South Wales, and its capital, Melbourne, outgrew Sydney. But the New South Wales gold fields also attracted a flood of prospectors, and by 1857 the colony had more than 300,000 people. Inland towns like Bathurst, Goulburn, Orange and Young flourished. Gold brought great wealth but also new social tensions. Multiethnic migrants came to New South Wales in large numbers for the first time. Young became the site of an infamous anti-Chinese miner riot in 1861 and the official Riot Act was read to the miners on 14 July—the only official reading in the history of New South Wales. Despite some tension, the influx of migrants also brought fresh ideas from Europe and North America to New South Wales—Norwegians introduced Skiing in Australia to the hills above the Snowy Mountains gold rush town of Kiandra around 1861. A famous Australian son was also born to a Norwegian miner in 1867, when the bush balladeer Henry Lawson was born at the Grenfell goldfields.

In 1858, a new gold rush began in the far north, which led in 1859 to the separation of Queensland as a new colony. New South Wales thus attained its present borders, although what is now the Northern Territory remained part of the colony until 1863, when it was handed over to South Australia. 1858 also saw the passing of the Chinese Immigration Bill through the Legislative Assembly under pressure from miners' representatives. It failed to pass the Legislative Council to the surprise of many. Members of that house were squatters and pastoralists keen to cheap Chinese labour in the country.

The separation and rapid growth of Victoria and Queensland mark the real beginning of New South Wales as a political and economic entity distinct from the other Australian colonies. Rivalry between New South Wales and Victoria was intense throughout the second half of the 19th century, and the two colonies developed in radically different directions. Once the easy gold ran out by about 1860, Victoria absorbed the surplus labour force from the gold fields in manufacturing, protected by high tariff walls. Victoria became the Australian stronghold of protectionism, liberalism and radicalism. New South Wales, which was less radically affected demographically by the gold rushes, remained more conservative, still dominated politically by the squatter class and its allies in the Sydney business community. New South Wales, as a trading and exporting colony, remained wedded to free trade.

At Broken Hill, New South Wales in the 1880s, BHP Billiton (now a major global mining and gas company) began as a silver, lead and zinc mine operation. By 1891, the population of the Outback town had passed 21,000, making Broken Hill the third-largest town in the colony of New South Wales.

=== Cultural development ===
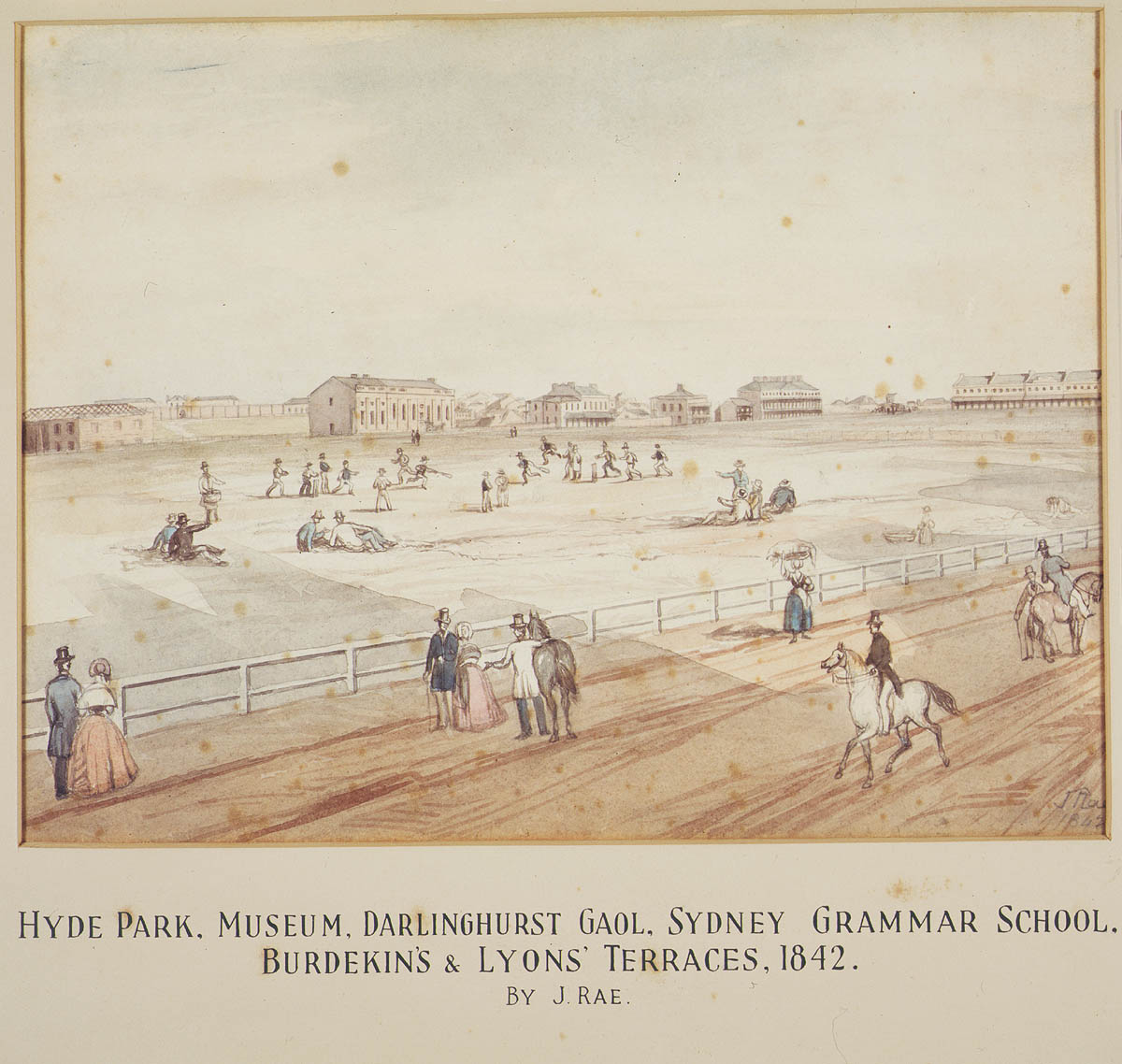
Hyde Park, Sydney with the Australian Museum under construction in the distance, 1842

In the course of the 19th century the increasingly ambitious colony established many of its major cultural institutions. The first Sydney Royal Easter Show, an agricultural exhibition and New South Wales cultural institution, began in 1823. Alexander Macleay started collecting the exhibits of Australia's oldest museum—Sydney's Australian Museum—in 1826 and the current building opened to the public in 1857. The Sydney Morning Herald newspaper began printing in 1831. The University of Sydney commenced in 1850. The Royal National Park, south of Sydney opened in 1879 (second only to Yellowstone National Park in the USA). An academy of art formed in 1870 and the present Art Gallery of New South Wales building began construction in 1896.

The New South Wales Rugby Union (or then, The Southern RU – SRU) was established in 1874, and the very first club competition took place in Sydney that year. In 1882 the first New South Wales team was selected to play Queensland in a two-match series (initially popular, the sport would become secondary in popularity in New South Wales after the creation of the New South Wales Rugby League as a professional code in 1907). In 1878 the inaugural first class cricket match at the Sydney Cricket Ground was played between New South Wales and Victoria.

The Sydney International Exhibition of 1879 showcased the colonial capital to the world. Some exhibits from this event were kept to constitute the original collection of the new Technological, Industrial and Sanitary Museum of New South Wales (today's Powerhouse Museum).

Two Sydney journalists, J. F. Archibald and John Haynes, founded The Bulletin magazine: the first edition appeared on 31 January 1880. It was intended to be a journal of political and business commentary, with some literary content. Initially radical, nationalist, democratic and racist, it gained wide influence and became a celebrated entry-point to publication for Australian writers and cartoonists such as Henry Lawson, Banjo Paterson, Miles Franklin, and the illustrator and novelist Norman Lindsay. A celebrated literary debate played out on the pages of the Bulletin about the nature of life in the Australian bush featuring the conflicting views of such as Paterson (called romantic) and Lawson (who saw bush life as exceedingly harsh) and notions of an Australian 'national character' were taking firmer root.

=== Self-government and democracy ===
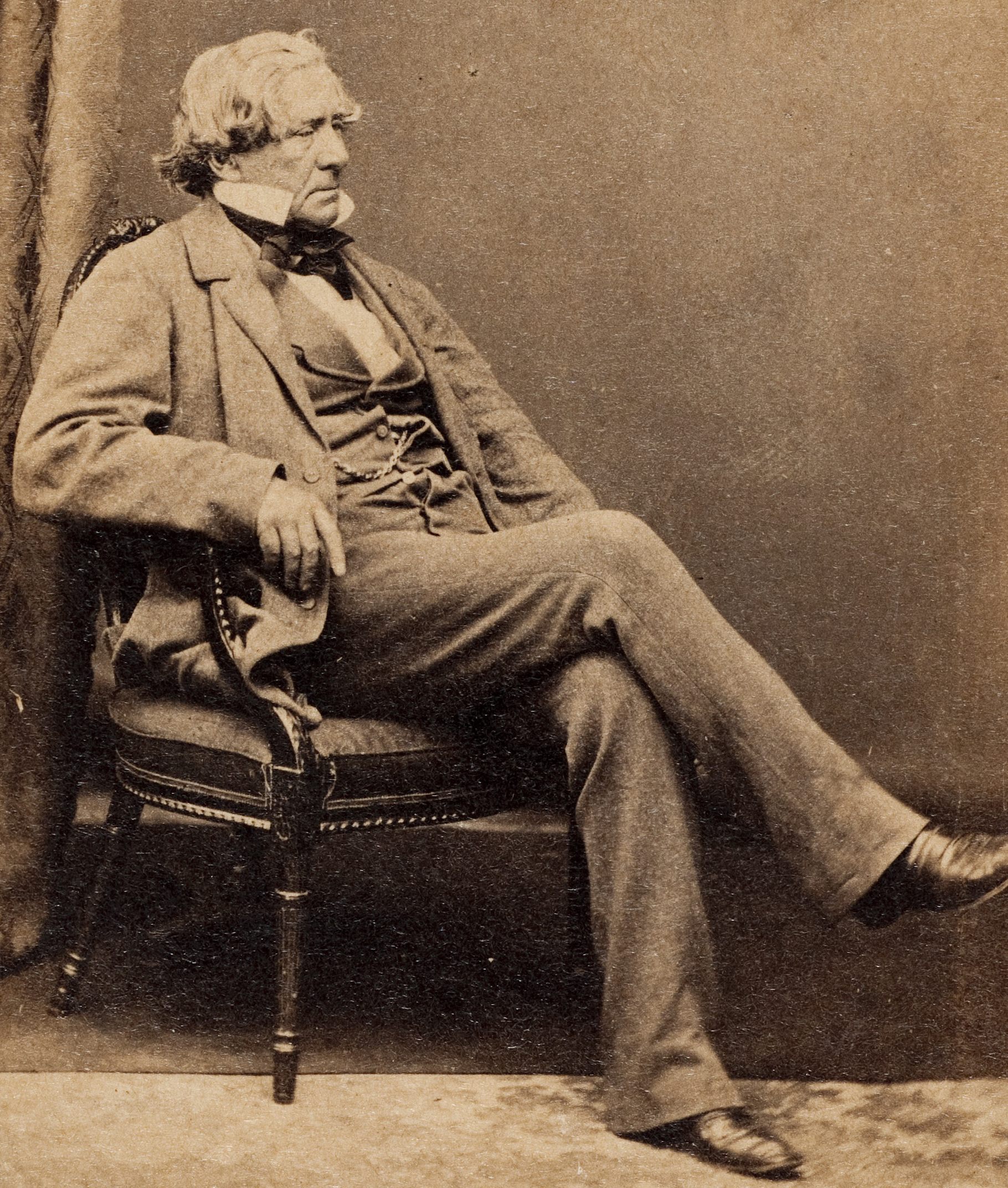
William Wentworth was key in the establishment of self-governance in New South Wales

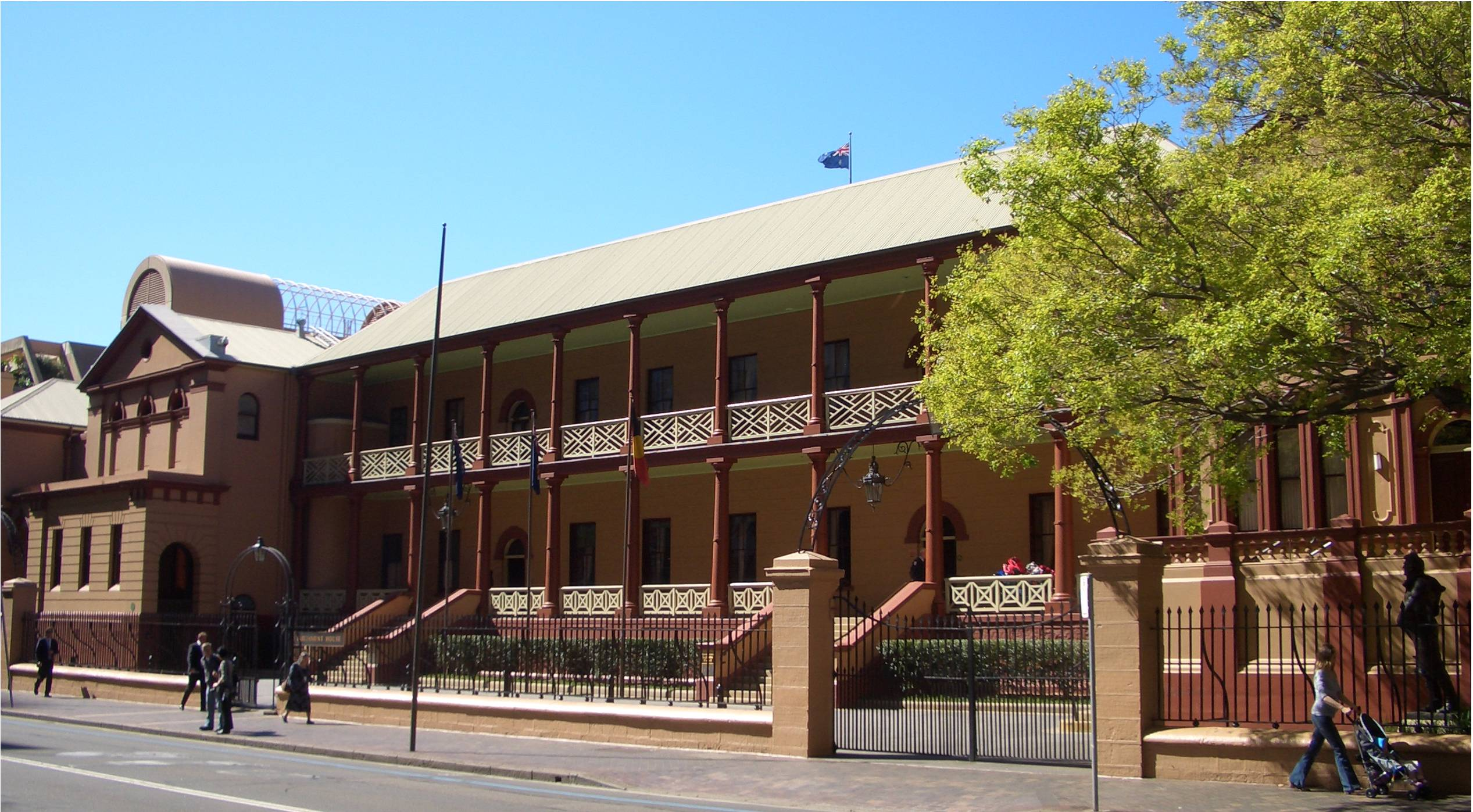
The New South Wales Parliament is Australia's oldest parliament.

William Wentworth established the Australian Patriotic Association (Australia's first political party) in 1835 to demand democratic government for New South Wales. The reformist attorney general, John Plunkett, sought to apply Enlightenment principles to governance in the colony, pursuing the establishment of equality before the law, first by extending jury rights to emancipists, then by extending legal protections to convicts, assigned servants and Indigenous Australians. Plunkett twice charged the colonist perpetrators of the Myall Creek massacre of Aboriginal people with murder, resulting in a conviction and his landmark Church Act 1836 disestablished the Church of England and established legal equality between Anglicans, Catholics, Presbyterians and, later, Methodists.

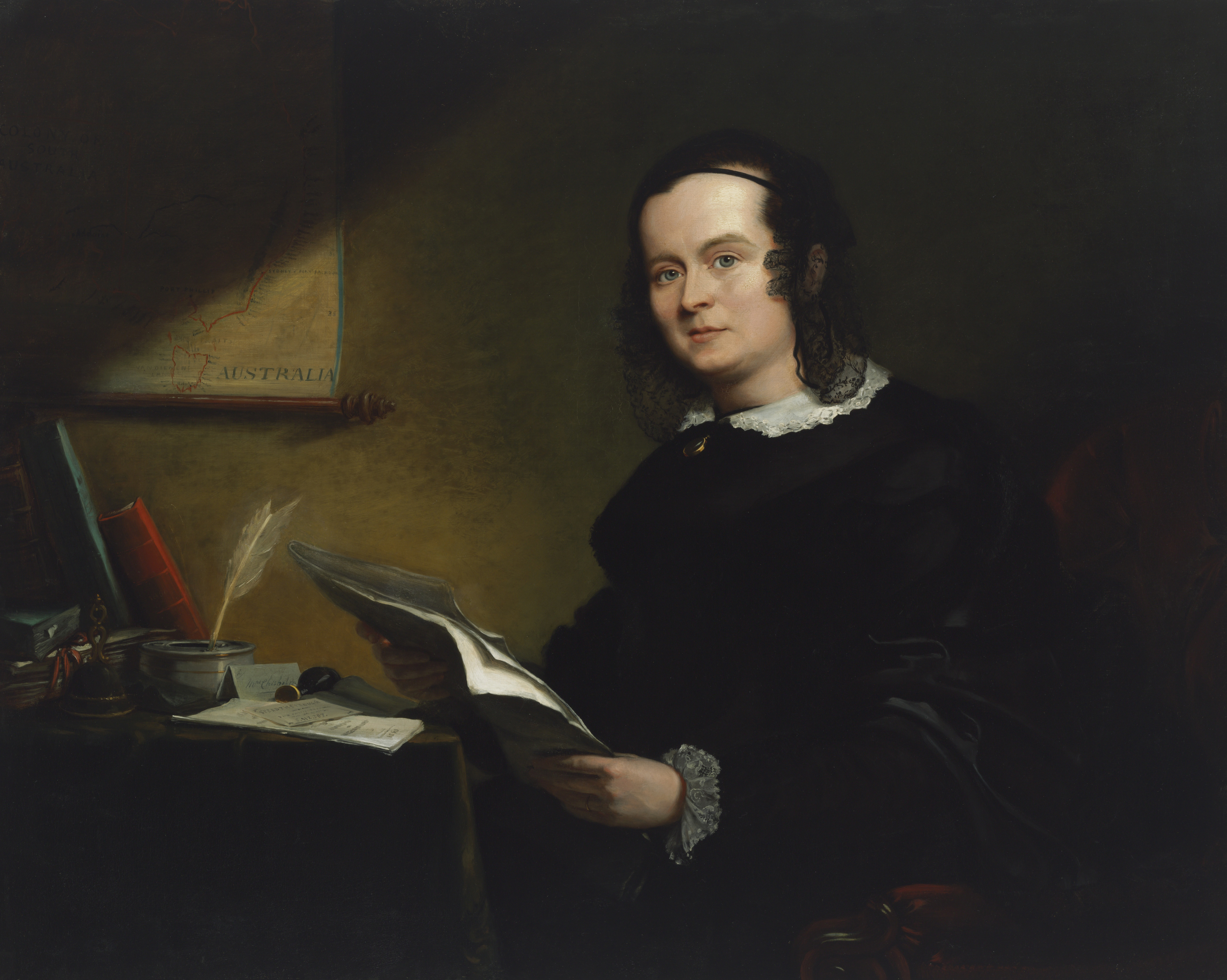
Humanitarian Caroline Chisholm provided support to poverty-stricken women migrants

In 1838, the celebrated humanitarian Caroline Chisolm arrived at Sydney and soon after began her work to alleviate the conditions for the poor women migrants of the colony. She met every immigrant ship at the docks, found positions for immigrant girls and established a Female Immigrants' Home. Later she began campaigning for legal reform to alleviate poverty and assist female immigration and family support in the colonies.

In 1842, the Sydney City Council was established. Men who possessed property worth at least £1000 were able to stand for election and wealthy landowners were permitted up to four votes each in elections. Australia's first parliamentary elections were conducted for the New South Wales Legislative Council in 1843, again with voting rights (for males only) tied to property ownership or financial capacity. The Australian Constitutions Act 1850 (13 & 14 Vict. c. 59 (Imp)) was a landmark development which granted representative constitutions to New South Wales, Victoria, South Australia and Tasmania and the colonies enthusiastically set about writing constitutions which produced democratically progressive parliaments—though the constitutions generally maintained the role of the colonial upper houses as representative of social and economic "interests"—and all established constitutional monarchies with the British monarch as the symbolic head of state.

The end of transportation and the rapid growth of population following the gold rush led to a demand for "British institutions" in New South Wales, which meant an elected parliament and responsible self-government. In 1851 the franchise for the Legislative Council was expanded, but this did not satisfy the settlers, many of whom (such as the young Henry Parkes) had been Chartists in Britain in the 1840s. Successive Governors warned the Colonial Office of the dangers of republicanism if the demands for self-government were not met. There was, however, a prolonged battle between the conservatives, now led by Wentworth, and the democrats as to what kind of constitution New South Wales would have. The key issue was control of the pastoral lands, which the democrats wanted to take away from the squatters and break up into farms for settlers. Wentworth wanted a hereditary upper house controlled by the squatters to prevent any such possibility. The radicals, led by rising politicians like Parkes and journalists like Daniel Deniehy, ridiculed suggestions of a "bunyip aristocracy."

1855 saw the granting of the right to vote to all male British subjects 21 years or over in South Australia. This right was extended to Victoria in 1857 and New South Wales the following year (the other colonies followed until, in 1896, Tasmania became the last colony to grant universal male suffrage).

The New South Wales Constitution Act 1855 (18 & 19 Vict. c. 54), steered through the British Parliament by the veteran radical Lord John Russell, who wanted a constitution which balanced democratic elements against the interests of property, as did the Parliamentary system in Britain at this time. The Act created a bicameral Parliament of New South Wales, with a lower house, the New South Wales Legislative Assembly, consisting of 54 members elected by adult males who met a moderate property qualification (anyone who owned property worth £100, or earned £100 a year, or held a pastoral licence, or who paid £10 a year for lodgings, could vote). The Assembly was heavily malapportioned in favour of the rural areas. The Legislative Council was to consist of at least 21 members (but with no upper limit) appointed for life by the Governor, and Council members had to meet a higher property qualification.

These seemed like formidable barriers to democracy, but in practice they did not prove so, because the Constitution Act could be modified by simple majorities of both Houses. In 1858 the property franchise for the Assembly was abolished, and the secret ballot introduced. Since the principle that the Governor should always act on the advice of his ministers was soon established, a Premier whose bills were rejected by the Council could simply advise the Governor to appoint more members until the opposition was "flooded": usually the threat of "flooding" was enough. The ministry of Charles Cowper marked the victory of colonial liberalism, although New South Wales liberals were never as radical as those in Victoria or South Australia. The major battle for the liberals, unlocking the lands from the squatters, was more or less won by John Robertson, five times Premier during the 1860s, who passed the Robertson Land Acts to break up the squatters' estates.

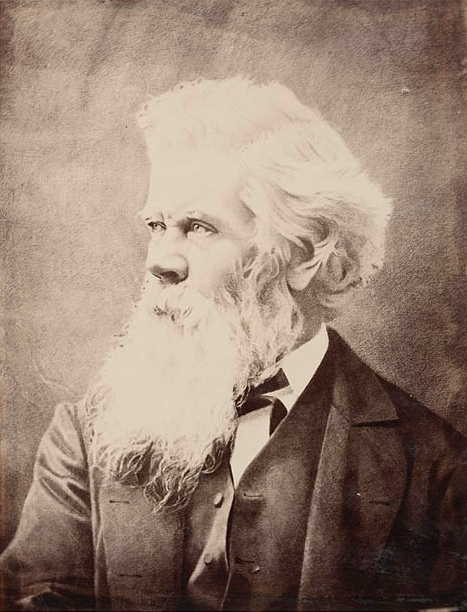
Sir Henry Parkes was a Premier of New South Wales and one of the "Fathers of Australian Federation"

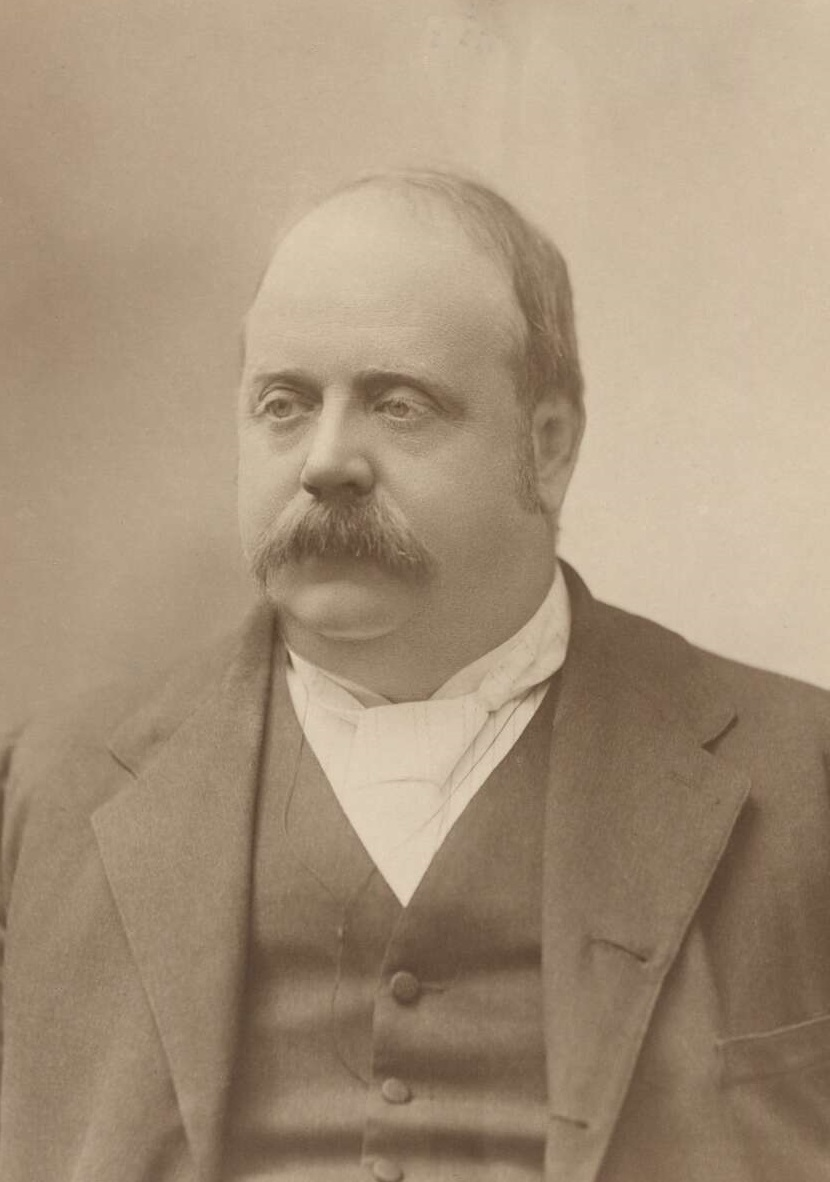
Sir George Reid was Premier of New South Wales in the lead up to Federation

From the 1860s onwards government in New South Wales became increasingly stable and assured. Fears of class conflict faded as the population bulge resulting from the gold rushes was accommodated on the newly available farmlands and in the rapidly growing towns. The last British troops left the colony in 1870, and law and order was maintained by the police and a locally raised militia, which had little to do apart from catching a few bushrangers. The only issue which really excited political passions in this period was education, which was the source of bitter conflict between Catholics, Protestants and secularists, who all had conflicting views on how schools should be operated, funded and supervised. This was a major preoccupation for Henry Parkes, the dominant politician of the period (he was Premier five times between 1872 and 1889). In 1866 Parkes, as Education Minister, brought in a compromise Schools Act that brought all religious schools under the supervision of public boards, in exchange for state subsidies. But in 1880 the secularists won out when Parkes withdrew all state aid for church schools and established a statewide system of free secular schools.

New South Wales and Victoria continued to develop along divergent paths. Parkes and his successor as leader of the New South Wales liberals, George Reid, were Gladstonian liberals committed to free trade, which they saw as both economically beneficial and as necessary for the unity of the British Empire. They regarded Victorian protectionism as economically foolish and narrowly parochial. It was this hostility between the two largest colonies, symbolised by Victorian customs posts along the Murray River, which prevented any moves towards uniting the Australian colonies, even after the advent of the railways and the telegraph made travel and communication between the colonies much easier by the 1870s. So long as Victoria was larger and richer than New South Wales, the mother colony (as it liked to see itself) would never agree to surrender its free trade principles to a national or federal government which would be dominated by Victorians.

== Statehood ==
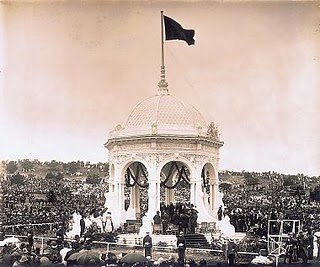
Federation Pavilion, Centennial Park, Sydney, 1 January 1901.

=== Federation ===
By the 1890s, several new factors were drawing the Australian colonies towards political union. The great land boom in Victoria in the 1880s was followed by a prolonged depression, which allowed New South Wales to recover the economic and demographic superiority it had lost in the 1850s. There was a steady rise in imperial sentiment in the 1880s and 1890s, which made the creation of united Australian dominion seem an important imperial project. The intrusion of other colonial powers such as France and Germany into the south-west Pacific area made colonial defence an urgent question, which became more urgent with the rise of Japan as an expansionist power. Finally, the issue of Chinese and other non-European immigration made the federation of the colonies an important issue, with advocates of a White Australia policy arguing the necessity of a national immigration policy.

As a result, the movement for federation was initiated by Parkes with his Tenterfield Oration of 1889 (earning him the title "Father of Federation"), and carried forward after Parkes' death by another New South Wales politician, Edmund Barton. Opinion in New South Wales about federation remained divided through the 1890s. The northern and southern border regions, which were most inconvenienced by the colonial borders and the system of intercolonial tariffs, were strongly in favour, while many in the Sydney commercial community were sceptical, fearing that a national Parliament would impose a national tariff (which was indeed what happened). The first attempt at federation in 1891 failed, mainly as a result of the economic crisis of the early 1890s. It was the federalists of the border regions who revived the federal movement in the later 1890s, leading up to the Constitutional Convention of 1897–98 which adopted a draft Australian Constitution.

When the draft was put to referendum in New South Wales in 1899, Reid (Free Trade Premier from 1894 to 1899), adopted an equivocal position, earning him the nickname "Yes-No Reid." The draft was rejected, mainly because New South Wales voters thought it gave the proposed Senate, which would be dominated by the smaller states, too much power. Reid was able to bargain with the other Premiers to modify the draft so that it suited New South Wales interests, and the draft was then approved. On 1 January 1901, following a proclamation by Queen Victoria, New South Wales ceased to be a self-governing colony and became a state of the Commonwealth of Australia. Although the new Governor-General and Prime Minister's swearing-in ceremonies were held in Sydney, Melbourne was to be the temporary seat of government until the permanent seat of government was established. This was to be in New South Wales, but at least 100 miles (160 km) from Sydney. The first Prime Minister (Barton) the first Opposition Leader (Reid) and the first Labor leader (Chris Watson) were all from New South Wales.

=== Federation to World War II ===
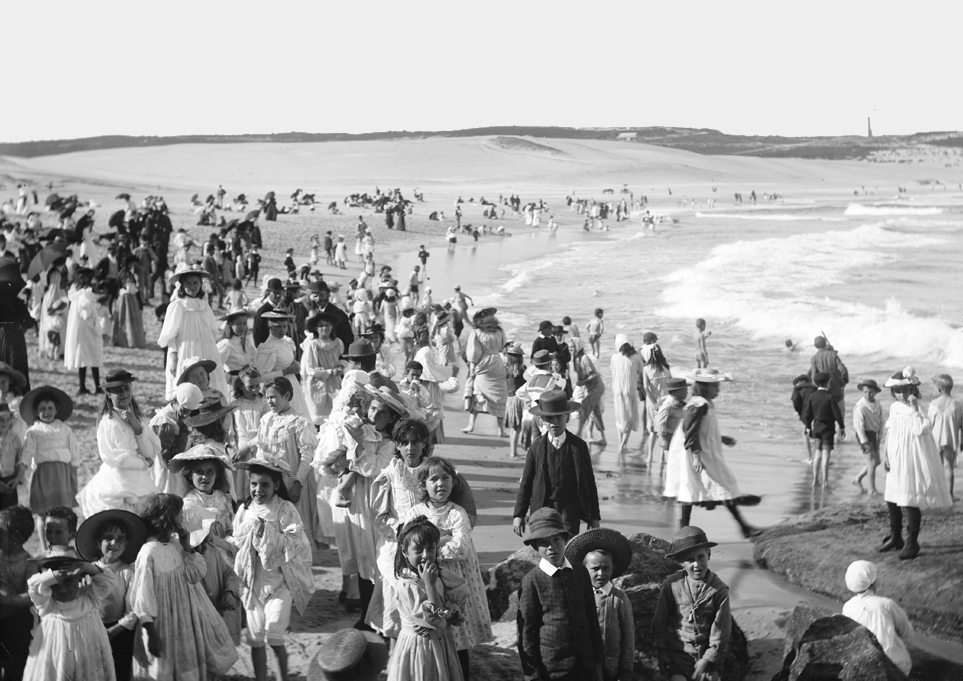
Bondi Beach circa 1900

At the time of federation the New South Wales economy was still heavily based on agriculture, particularly wool growing, although mining—coal from the Hunter Valley and silver, lead and zinc from Broken Hill—was also important. Federation was followed by the imposition of protective tariffs just as the Sydney Free Traders had feared, and this boosted domestic manufacturing. Farmers, however, suffered from increased costs, as well as from the prolonged drought that afflicted the state at the turn of the century. A further boost to both manufacturing and farming came from the increased demand during World War I. By the 1920s New South Wales was overtaking Victoria as the centre of Australian heavy industry, symbolised by the BHP Newcastle Steelworks, opened in 1915, and another steel mill at Port Kembla in 1928.

The growth of manufacturing and mining brought with it the growth of an industrial working class. Trade unions had been formed in New South Wales as early as the 1850s, but it was great labour struggles of the 1890s that led them to move into politics. The most important was the Australian Workers' Union (AWU), formed from earlier unions by William Spence and others in 1894. The defeat of the great shearers' and maritime strikes in the 1890s led the AWU to reject direct action and to take the lead in forming the Labor Party. Labor had its first great success in 1891, when it won 35 seats in the Legislative Assembly, mainly in the pastoral and mining areas. This first parliamentary Labor Party, led by Joseph Cook, supported Reid's Free Trade government, but broke up over the issue of free trade versus protection, and also over the "pledge" which the unions required Labor members to take always to vote in accordance with majority decisions. After federation, Labor, led by James McGowen, soon recovered, and won its first majority in the Assembly in 1910, when McGowen became the state's first Labor Premier.

The Aborigines Protection Act 1909 gave the Board for the Protection of Aborigines control of the Aboriginal reserves in New South Wales and the lives of the people who lived on the reserves. Amendments to the Act in 1915 gave the Aborigines Protection Board in New South Wales broad powers to remove Aboriginal children from their families, resulting in the Stolen Generations.

This early experience of government, plus the social base of New South Wales party in the rural areas rather than in the militant industrial working class of the cities, made New South Wales Labor notably more moderate than its counterparts in other states, and this, in turn, made it more successful at winning elections. The growth of the coal, iron, steel and shipbuilding industries gave Labor new "safe" areas in Newcastle and Wollongong, while the mining towns of Broken Hill and the Hunter also became Labor strongholds. As a result of these factors, Labor has ruled New South Wales for 59 of the 96 years since 1910.

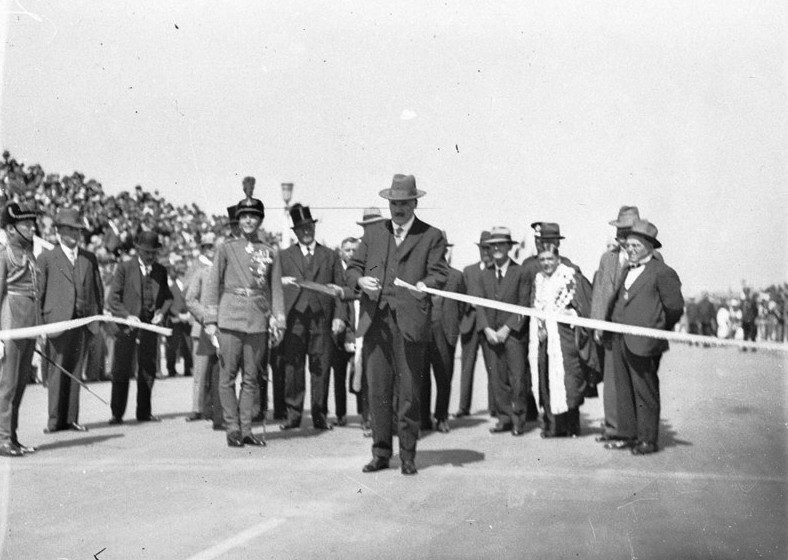
Ribbon ceremony to open the Sydney Harbour Bridge on 20 March 1932. Breaking protocol, the soon to be dismissed Premier Jack Lang cuts the ribbon while Governor Philip Game looks on.

But Labor came to grief in New South Wales as elsewhere during World War I, when the Premier, William Holman, supported the Labor Prime Minister Billy Hughes in his drive to introduce conscription. New South Wales voters rejected both attempts by Hughes to pass a referendum authorising conscription, and in 1916 Hughes, Holman, Watson, McGowen, Spence and many other founders of the party were expelled, forming the Nationalist Party under Hughes and Holman. Federal Labor did not recover from this split for many years, but New South Wales Labor was back in power by 1920, although this government lasted only 18 months, and again from 1925 under Jack Lang.

In the years after World War I it was the farmers rather than the workers who were the most discontented and militant class in New South Wales. The high prices enjoyed during the war fell with the resumption of international trade, and farmers became increasingly discontented with the fixed prices paid by the compulsory marketing authorities set up as a wartime measure by the Hughes government. In 1919 the farmers formed the Country Party, led at national level by Earle Page, a doctor from Grafton, and at state level by Michael Bruxner, a small farmer from Tenterfield. The Country Party used its reliable voting base to make demands on successive non-Labor governments, mainly to extract subsidies and other benefits for farmers, as well as public works in rural areas.

The Great Depression, which began in 1929, ushered in a period of unprecedented political and class conflict in New South Wales. The mass unemployment and collapse of commodity prices brought ruin to both city workers and to farmers. Lang's second government was elected in November 1930 on a policy of repudiating New South Wales' debt to British bondholders and using the money instead to help the unemployed through public works. This was denounced as illegal by conservatives, and condemned by James Scullin's federal Labor government. The result was that Lang's supporters in the federal Caucus brought down Scullin's government, causing a second bitter split in the Labor Party. in May 1932 the Governor, Sir Philip Game, convinced that Lang was acting illegally, dismissed his government, and Labor spent the rest of the 1930s in opposition.

In a Sheffield Shield cricket match at the Sydney Cricket Ground in 1930, Don Bradman, a young New South Welshman of just 21 years of age wrote his name into the record books by smashing the previous highest batting score in first-class cricket with 452 runs not out in just 415 minutes. Although Bradman would later transfer to play for South Australia, his world-beating performances provided much needed joy to Australians through the emerging Great Depression.

The 1938 British Empire Games were held in Sydney from 5 to 12 February, timed to coincide with Sydney's sesqui-centenary (150 years since the foundation of British settlement in Australia).

=== World War II ===
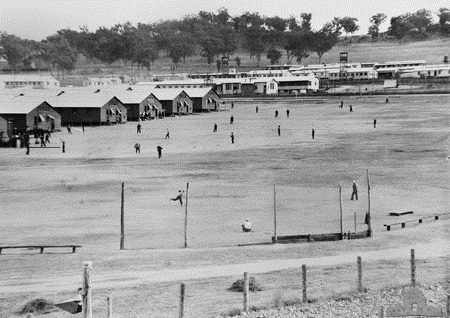
Japanese POW camp at Cowra, shortly before the Cowra breakout

By the outbreak of World War II in 1939, the differences between New South Wales and the other states that had emerged in the 19th century had faded as a result of federation and economic development behind a wall of protective tariffs. New South Wales continued to outstrip Victoria as the centre of industry, and increasingly of finance and trade as well.

World War II saw another surge in industrial development to meet the needs of a war economy, and also the elimination of unemployment. When Ben Chifley, a railwayman from Bathurst, became prime minister in 1945, New South Wales Labor assumed what it saw as its rightful position of national leadership.

After launching their Pacific War, the Imperial Japanese Navy managed to infiltrate New South Wales waters and in late May and early June 1942, Japanese submarines made a series of attacks on the cities of Sydney and Newcastle. Though casualties were light, the population feared Japanese invasion. The main Japanese naval advance towards Australian territory was however halted by the carriers of the United States Navy, in May 1942, at the Battle of the Coral Sea. The only fighting on land came in te Cowra breakout of 1944 when Japanese prisoners of war launched a suicidal escape attempt from their camp in the Central West of New South Wales.

== Post World War II ==
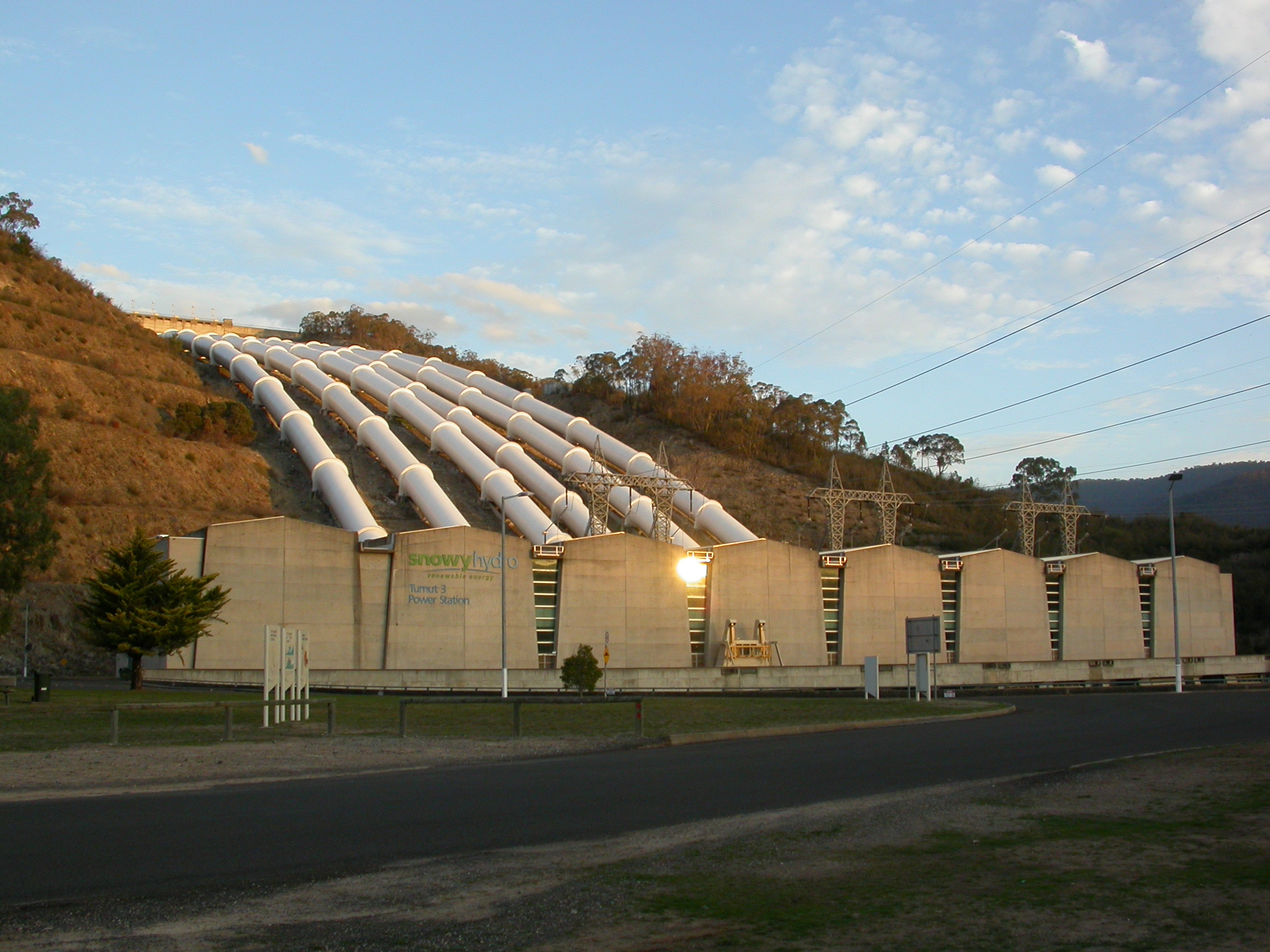
Tumut 3 Power Station was constructed as part of the vast Snowy Mountains Scheme in New South Wales (1949–1974). Construction necessitated the expansion of Australia's immigration program.

The postwar years, however, saw renewed industrial conflict, culminating in the 1949 coal strike, largely fomented by the Communist Party of Australia, which crippled the state's industry. This contributed to the defeat of the Chifley government at the 1949 elections and the beginning of the long rule at a Federal level of Robert Menzies, a politician from Victoria, of the newly founded Liberal Party of Australia. The postwar years also saw massive immigration to Australia, begun by Chifley's Immigration Minister, Arthur Calwell, and continued under the Liberals. Sydney, hitherto an almost entirely British and Irish city by origin (apart from a small Chinese community), became increasingly multi-cultural, with many immigrants from Italy, Greece, Malta and Eastern Europe (including many Jews), and later from Lebanon and Vietnam, permanently changing its character.

The Snowy Mountains Scheme began construction in the state's south. This hydroelectricity and irrigation complex in the Snowy Mountains called for the construction of sixteen major dams and seven power stations between 1949 and 1974. It remains the largest engineering project undertaken in Australia and necessitated the employment of 100,000 people from over 30 countries. Socially this project symbolises a period during which Australia became an ethnic "melting pot" of the twentieth century but which also changed Australia's character and increased its appreciation for a wide range of cultural diversity. The scheme built several temporary towns for its construction workers, several of which have become permanent: notably Cabramurra, which became the highest town in Australia. The sleepy rural town of Cooma became a bustling construction economy, while small rural townships like Adaminaby and Jindabyne had to make way for the construction of Lakes Eucumbene and Jindabyne. Improved vehicular access to the High Country enabled ski-resort villages to be constructed at Thredbo and Guthega in the 1950s by ex-Snowy Scheme workers who realised the potential for expansion of Skiing in Australia.

Labor remained in power in New South Wales until 1965 when the Liberal Party led by Robert Askin won government.

=== Post 1970s ===
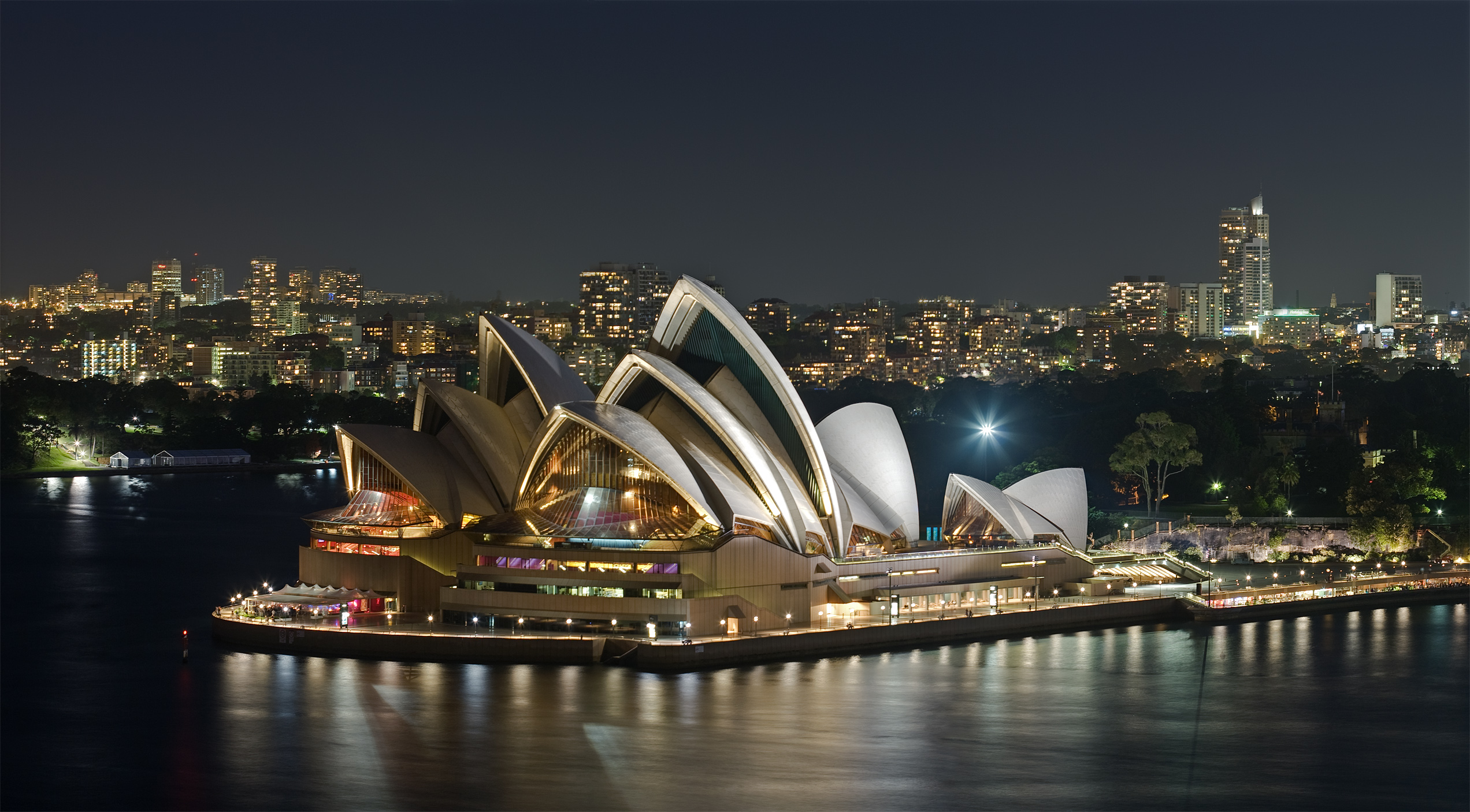
Sydney Opera House was opened in 1973.

Since the 1970s New South Wales has undergone an increasingly rapid economic and social transformation. Old industries such as steel and shipbuilding have largely disappeared, and although agriculture remains important, its share of the state's income is smaller than ever before. New industries such as information technology, education, financial services and the arts, largely centred in Sydney, have risen to take their place. Coal exports to China are increasingly important to the state's economy. Tourism has also become hugely important, with Sydney as its centre but also stimulating growth on the North Coast, around Coffs Harbour and Byron Bay. As aviation has replaced shipping, most new migrants to Australia have arrived in Sydney by air rather than in Melbourne by ship, and Sydney now gets the lion's share of new arrivals, mostly from Asia, Latin America and the Middle East.

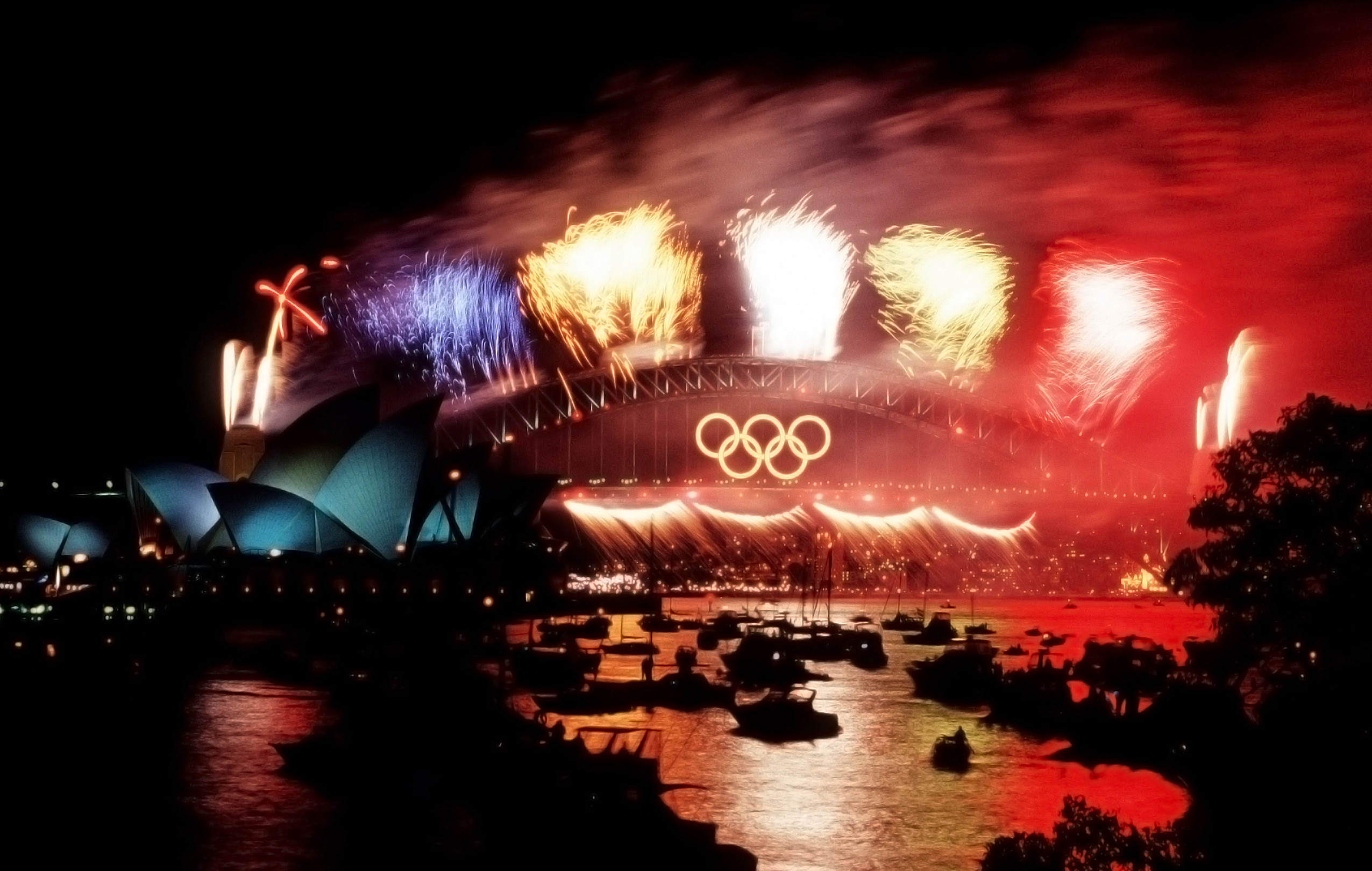
Olympic colours on the Sydney Harbour Bridge in the year 2000

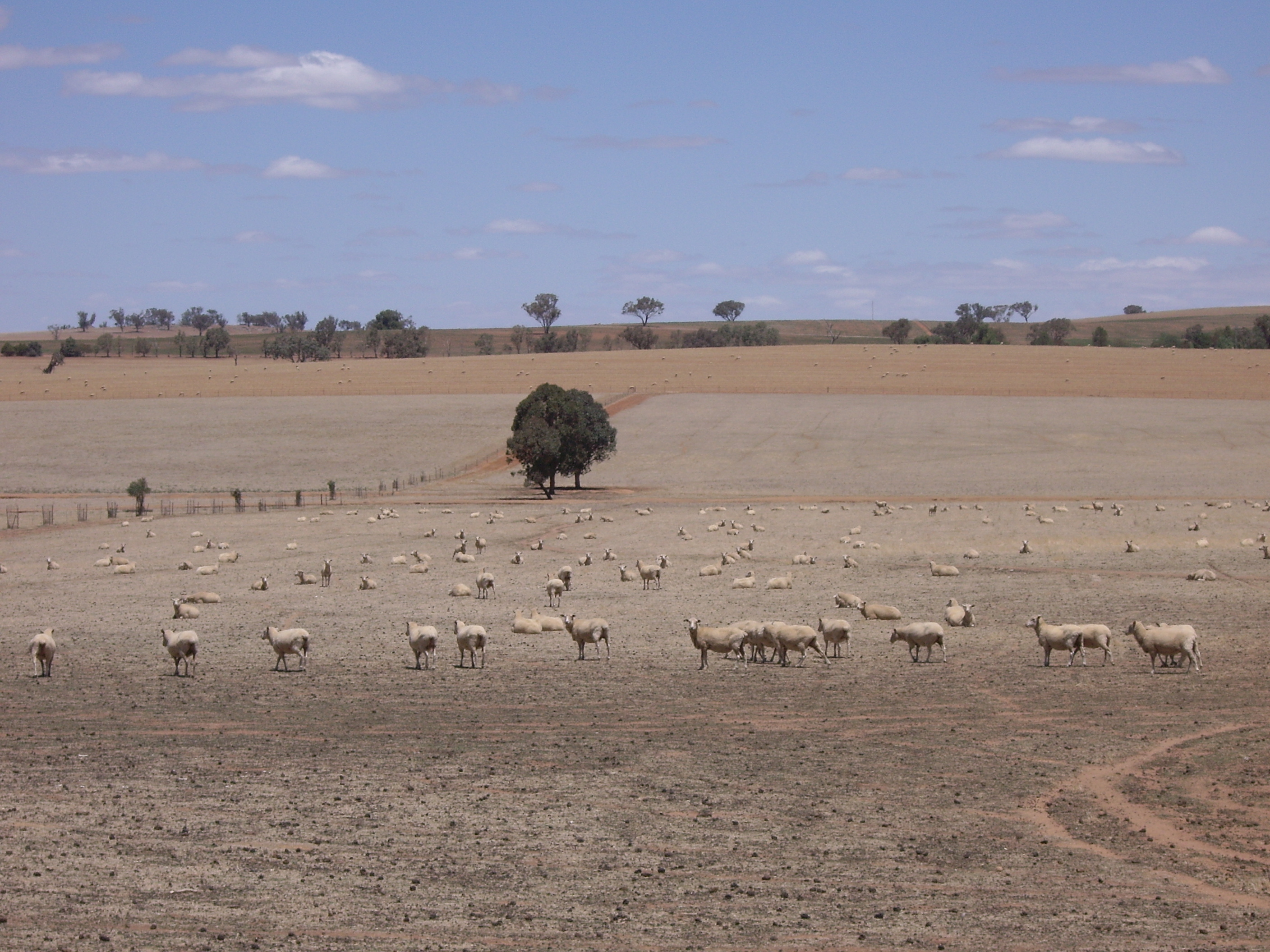
Dry paddocks in the Riverina region during the 2007 drought

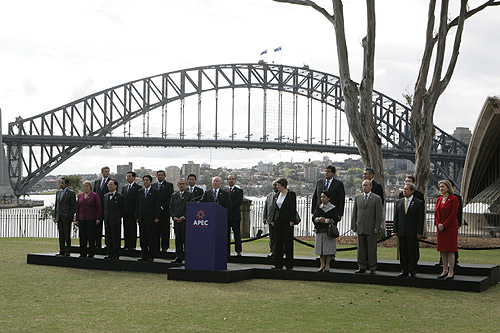
World leaders with Prime Minister John Howard in Sydney for the 2007 APEC conference

Although generally of mild climate, the State endured several notable natural disasters around the turn of the century. In 1989, an earthquake struck Newcastle. It was a Richter magnitude 5.6 earthquake and one of Australia's most serious natural disasters, killing 13 people and injuring more than 160. The damage bill has been estimated at A$4 billion (including an insured loss of about $1 billion). The Newcastle earthquake was the first Australian earthquake in recorded history to claim human lives. The following, year, 1990, saw major flooding in the state's central west, with Nyngan suffering a devastating inundation. In 1993–94, the state suffered a serious bushfire season, causing destruction even within urban areas of Sydney. Agricultural production was severely curtailed by prolonged drought during the late 1990s and early 2000s, particularly in the Murray-Darling basin. The drought was followed by severe flooding in 2010.

In 1973, after a long period of planning and construction, the Sydney Opera House was officially opened. The building was from a design by Jørn Utzon. It became a symbol not only of Sydney, but of the Australian nation and was inscribed by UNESCO in 2007. Sydney has maintained extensive political, economic and cultural influence over Australia as well as international renown in recent decades. The city hosted the 2000 Olympic Games, the 2003 Rugby World Cup and the APEC Leaders conference of 2007. From 1991 to 2007, Sydney-siders governed as Prime Minister of Australia—first Paul Keating (1991–1996) and later John Howard (1996–2007).

In recent decades Sydney has also undergone a major social liberalisation, with huge entertainment and gambling industries. Though there has been a decline in the dominance of Christianity through increased secularisation and the growing presence of an increasingly diverse migrant population, Sydney's two outspoken Archbishops, George Pell (Catholic) and Peter Jensen (Anglican) remain vocal in national debates and the hosting of Catholic World Youth Day 2008, led by Pope Benedict XVI, drew huge crowds of worshipers to the city. An evangelical Christian "bible belt" has developed in the north-western suburbs. Buddhist and Muslim communities in particular are growing, but so is irreligiosity. While a grant from the State government permitted the final completion of the spires of St Mary's Cathedral, Sydney in 2000 (the foundation stone was laid in 1868), construction of the present structure of the large Auburn Gallipoli Mosque began in 1986 and at Wollongong, south of Sydney, Nan Tien Temple opened in 1995 as one of the Southern Hemisphere's largest Buddhist temples. Sydney has gained a reputation for secularism and hedonism, with the Sydney Gay and Lesbian Mardi Gras becoming a world-famous event. Star City Casino opened in the mid-1990s as Sydney's only legal casino.

The Australian Labor Party has had long periods of governance in New South Wales in recent decades, holding power under Neville Wran and Barrie Unsworth from 1976 to 1988. A period of Liberal-National Coalition rule followed under Nick Greiner and John Fahey from 1988 to 1995, but the Labor Party was led back to power by Bob Carr in 1995 and remained in office until 2011. Carr retired and was succeeded by a series of Labor premiers between 2005 and 2011: Morris Iemma won the 2007 election but his party replaced him with Nathan Rees in 2007, who was, in turn, replaced by Kristina Keneally in 2008. Two recent Premiers have been of non-British background: Greiner (Liberal 1988–92), who is of Hungarian descent, and Iemma whose parents are Italian. The former Governor of New South Wales, Marie Bashir, is of Lebanese origin and is the first woman to be appointed to the office of governor.

Most commentators predict that Sydney and the coast areas of northern New South Wales will continue to grow in the coming decades, although Bob Carr and others have argued that Sydney (which by 2006 had over 4 million people) cannot grow any bigger without putting intolerable strain on its environment and infrastructure. The southern coastal areas around Canberra are also expected to grow, although less rapidly. The rest of the state, however, is expected to continue to decline, as traditional industries disappear. Already many small towns in western New South Wales have lost so many services and businesses that they are no longer viable, causing population to consolidate in regional centres like Dubbo and Wagga Wagga.

=== Post-Labor era ===
On 26 March 2011, the Liberal/National Coalition, led by Barry O'Farrell, won a landslide victory over the ALP. This has been regarded by political pundits as being a realignment of New South Wales politics away from Labor being the traditional party of Government.

== Boundary and naming ==
In one of those peculiarities of history, New South Wales was only officially named and had its boundaries declared in 2001, two hundred and thirty-one years after James Cook first uttered the name in 1770 when taking possession of an area covering most of eastern Australia. The reason why this peculiarity arose relates to the territorial evolution of Australia. The colony of New South Wales was established and named by way of imperial proclamation in 1788 by the then Governor in Chief of New South Wales, the Royal Navy officer Arthur Phillip. At this time, New South Wales was defined (by Britain) as covering approximately half of the Australian continent. New South Wales was further increased in size to around two-thirds of the Australian continent in 1828. All the Australian states and two territories, bar Western Australia, were then created from New South Wales during the 1800s and early 1900s. Each new state and territory, bar the Australian Capital Territory and Jervis Bay Territory, was created by Britain through letters patent and they were constitutionally connected to Britain. As the new States and the Australian Capital Territory (the Northern Territory was made from South Australia) were created, they steadily reduced the size of New South Wales. At no stage over this period of time, as New South Wales shrunk, was the boundary of New South Wales ever officially defined. The remains of New South Wales were only finally and officially defined in the New South Wales government gazette, by boundary and name, on 24 August 2001 by the Geographical Names Board of New South Wales. The results of this meant that although New South Wales was the progenitor state of Australia, the text of the gazettal defines New South Wales in terms of its borders with the other states that were created from and after it:

Pursuant to the provisions of section 7 (1) of the Geographical Names Act 1966, the Geographical Names Board has this day assigned the name New South Wales to the land that is bounded on the north by Queensland, bounded on the west by South Australia, bounded on the south by Victoria, and bounded on the east by the coastline of the Pacific Ocean and including all the lands under the control of the New South Wales Government but not including the Australian Capital Territory.

== See also ==
- Historical Records of New South Wales
- Convict ships to New South Wales
- Governor of New South Wales
- Historical Records of Australia
- History of Australia
- History of infrastructure development in Bathurst
- History of Newcastle
- History of Sydney
- List of colonial vessels of New South Wales
- Rufus River massacre
- History of New South Wales, copyright free image gallery.
- COVID-19 pandemic in New South Wales

== Sources ==
- Beaglehole, J. C. (1974). The Life of Captain James Cook. London: Adam & Charles Black.
- Blainey, Geoffrey (2020). Captain Cook's Epic Voyage: the Strange Quest for a Missing Continent. Melbourne and Sydney: Viking. ISBN 9781760895099.
- Christopher, Emma; Maxwell-Stewart, Hamish (2013). "Convict transportation in global context c. 1700–88". In Bashford, Alison; Macintyre, Stuart (eds.). The Cambridge History of Australia, Volume 1, Indigenous and Colonial Australia. Cambridge University Press. ISBN 978-1-1070-1153-3.
- Macintyre, Stuart (2020). A Concise History of Australia (5th ed.). Port Melbourne: Cambridge University Press. ISBN 9781108728485.
- Thomas, Nicholas (2003). Discoveries: The Voyages of Captain Cook. Various: Allen Lane. ISBN 0713995572.
- Veth, Peter; O'Connor, Sue (2013). "The past 50,000 years: an archaeological view". In Bashford, Alison; MacIntyre, Stuart (eds.). The Cambridge History of Australia, Volume 1, Indigenous and Colonial Australia. Cambridge: Cambridge University Press. ISBN 978-1-107-01153-3.
