= Jean Arnot =

Australian librarian, trade unionist and feminist

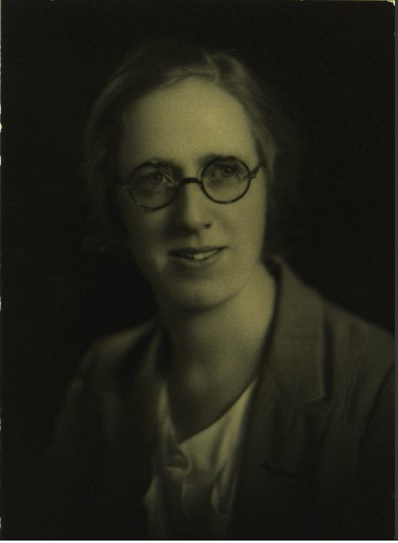
- Portrait of Jean Arnot
- Born: Jean Fleming Arnot; 23 April 1903; Pymble, New South Wales, Australia
- Died: 27 September 1995 (aged 92)
- Occupation: Librarian at State Library of New South Wales

Jean Fleming Arnot MBE (23 April 1903 – 27 September 1995) was an Australian librarian, trade unionist, activist for equal pay for women and feminist. She worked at the State Library of New South Wales from 1921 until her retirement in 1968.

== Early life ==
Jean Arnot was born in Pymble, New South Wales, on 23 April 1903. She attended Fort Street Girls' High School. Arnot enjoyed mathematics at school and hoped to study science at university, but her family circumstances prevented her from pursuing further study.

== Career ==
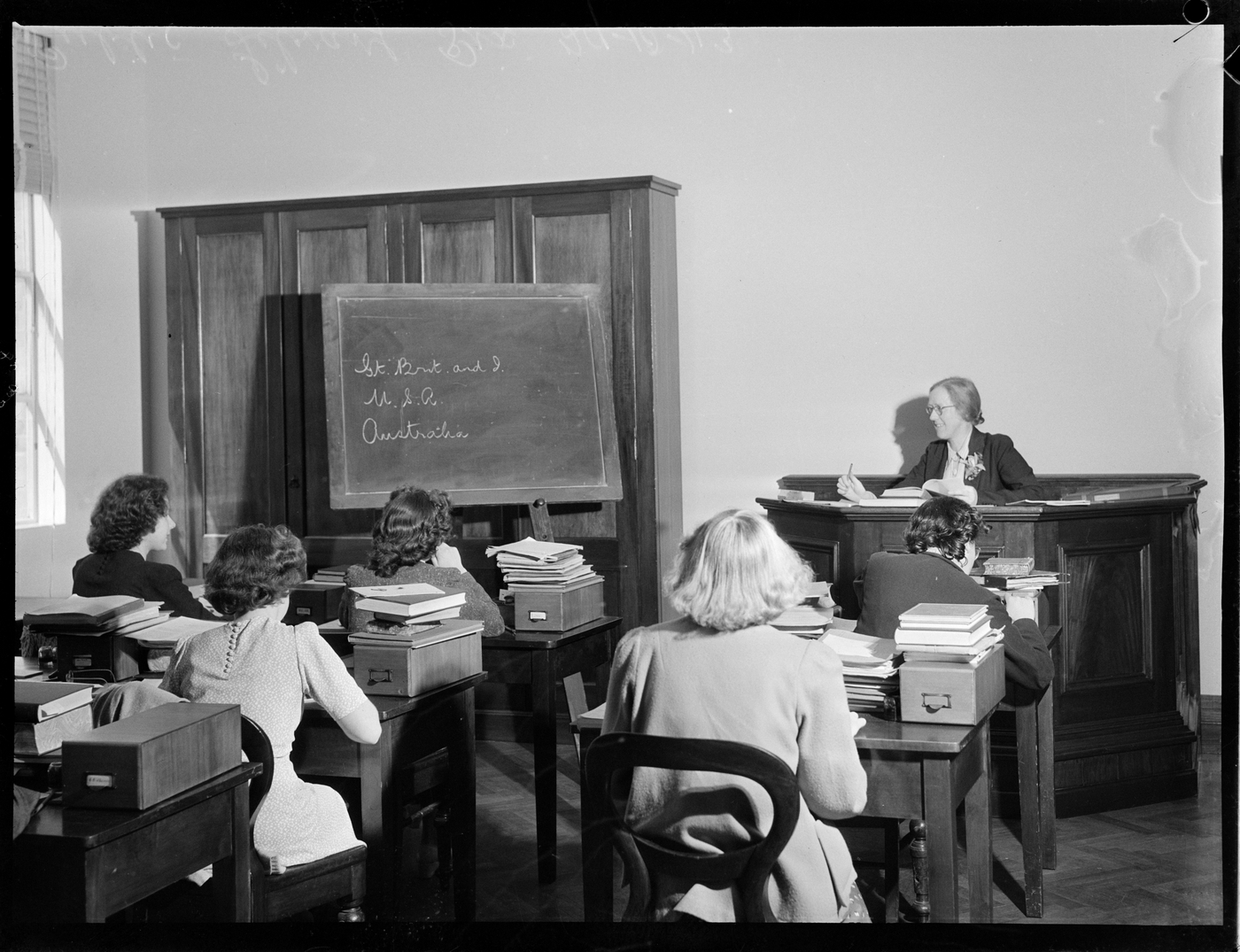
Librarians attending a cataloguing class at the Mitchell Library in 1943

Arnot's career at the State Library of New South Wales began with the role of temporary junior library assistant in March 1921. She was acutely aware of the disparity of the wages earned by women, for example a male cleaner was paid considerably more than a female graduate library assistant when she joined the library staff. She became an active campaigner for equal pay for women from 1937 onwards.

Arnot progressed through a number of roles at the library, including cataloguing serials, extension librarian providing services to country areas of New South Wales, head cataloguer and acting Mitchell librarian from 1956–1958. She also received funding from the British Council and the Carnegie Corporation of New York which allowed her to travel in 1948–1949 to study library services in Great Britain and North America. Despite acknowledgement by the Library trustees of her achievements as Acting Mitchell Librarian during the absence of Phyllis Mander-Jones, Arnot was unsuccessful in applying for the position of Mitchell Librarian in 1958.

In 1961, Arnot was a member of the Australian delegation to the First International Conference on Cataloguing Principles, which was held in Paris. Amongst the delegates representing fifty-three countries, including Dr S. R. Ranganathan from India and Seymour Lubetzky from the Library of Congress, Arnot's contributions to the discussions are recorded in the conference papers.

Arnot retired as head cataloguer in 1968 after a distinguished career of over 47 years of service. In her retirement she held the voluntary role of honorary librarian of the Royal Australian Historical Society from 1969 to 1980.

== Awards and memorials ==
Arnot received the Gold Medal of the Public Service Association of New South Wales in 1944. In 1963, she was recognised by her peers, receiving the distinction of Fellow of the Library Association of Australia. On 12 June 1965, Arnot was appointed as a Member of the Order of the British Empire (Civil) for her community services in the Sydney area.

The Jean Arnot Memorial Fellowship is an award made to a female librarian or female student of librarianship in Australia, funded by the National Council of Women of New South Wales Incorporated and the Australian Federation of Business and Professional Women's Associations Incorporated as a memorial to Arnot and her achievements. Arnot was very active in both these associations.

Arnot died in Sydney on 27 September 1995, at the age of 92.

== See also ==
- State Library of New South Wales
- Ida Leeson
- Nita Kibble
- Phyllis Mander-Jones
