= Historical Records of Australia =

Publications on the history of Australia

The Historical Records of Australia (HRA) were collected and published by the Library Committee of the Commonwealth Parliament, to create a series of accurate publications on the history of Australia. The records begin shortly before 1788, the year that the first British settlement was established in Australia (at Port Jackson).

The HRA currently comprises 37 volumes. The first 33 volumes are available freely online (see "External links", below).

== Structure of the HRA ==
The Historical Records of Australia comprise three series of volumes. Within a series, each separate volume is roughly 900 pages in length.

Series I comprises 26 volumes. It was published during 1914-1925. It contains despatches of the Governors, who were in charge of the Crown colonies in Australia, to and from the authorities in England. Those despatches include detailed reports on many subjects, of both major and minor importance. Some of the things to be found in this series are arrivals of ships, convict records, correspondence, promotions, petitions, rations, embarkation, and appointments.

Series III currently comprises 10 volumes. The first six volumes were published during 1914-1925; Volume VII was published in 1999, Volume VIII in 2003, Volume IX in 2006, and Volume X in 2013. Series III contains documents related to the settlement of the states (especially Tasmania).

Series IV comprises only one volume, published in 1922. It contains documents relating to the legal system.

Originally, it was envisaged that there would be seven separate series; so far, three have appeared: I, III, IV.

I Despatches of Governors to and from England
II Papers belonging to the general administration
III Settlements in the different states
IV Legal papers
V Explorations
VI Scientific
VIII Ecclesiastical, naval, and military papers

== Editors of the HRA ==
The Historical Records of Australia was effectively founded by J. Frederick Watson. Watson was appointed editor of the volumes by the Library Committee of the Commonwealth Parliament, in 1912. Between 1912 and 1925, Watson almost single-handedly collated, edited, and supervised the publication of 33 volumes of documents; the volumes were for the period from 1786 to 1848. Watson resigned in 1925, after which no further volumes were published until 1999, when publication was resumed under the editorship of Peter Chapman.

== See also ==
- Australian Joint Copying Project
- Historical Records of New South Wales
- History of Australia (1788–1850)
- Pacific Manuscripts Bureau
- Trove#Newspapers
