= Frank Murcott Bladen =

(1858–1912) librarian and historian

Frank Murcott Bladen (1858-1912) was an English-born Australian librarian and historian.

== Notable works ==
Historical records of New South Wales

- Bladen, F. M. (Frank Murcott), ed. (1893), Historical records of New South Wales, Volume 1, Part 1—Cook, 1762-1780, Sydney: Charles Potter, Government Printer, OL 20445908M
- Bladen, F. M. (Frank Murcott), ed. (1892), Historical records of New South Wales, Facsimiles of charts to accompany Volume 1, Part 1—Cook, 1762-1780, Sydney: Charles Potter, Government Printer, OL 26242827M
- Bladen, F. M. (Frank Murcott), ed. (1892), Historical records of New South Wales, Volume 1, Part 2—Phillip, 1783-1792, Sydney: Charles Potter, Government Printer, OL 26242838M
- Bladen, F. M. (Frank Murcott), ed. (1893), Historical records of New South Wales, Volume 2—Grose and Paterson, 1793-1795, Sydney: Charles Potter, Government Printer
- Bladen, F. M. (Frank Murcott), ed. (1892), Historical records of New South Wales, Volume 3—Hunter, 1796–1799, Sydney: Charles Potter, Government Printer (published 1895), OL 20445904M
- Bladen, F. M. (Frank Murcott), ed. (1892), Historical records of New South Wales, Volume 4—Hunter and King, 1801,1802,1803, Sydney: Charles Potter, Government Printer (published 1896), OL 20445905M
- Bladen, F. M. (Frank Murcott), ed. (1892), Historical records of New South Wales, Volume 5—King, 1803-1805, Sydney: Charles Potter, Government Printer (published 1897), OL 3048032M
- Bladen, F. M. (Frank Murcott), ed. (1898), Historical records of New South Wales, Volume 6—King and Bligh, 1806-1807, 1808, Sydney: William Applegate Gullick, Government Printer, OL 20531287M
- Bladen, F. M. (Frank Murcott), ed. (1892), Historical records of New South Wales, Volume 7—Bligh and Macquarie, 1809, 1810, 1811, Sydney: William Applegate Gullick, Government Printer (published 1901), OL 26242863M

== See also ==
- Australian Joint Copying Project
- State Library of New South Wales
