= Australian Joint Copying Project =

The Australian Joint Copying Project (AJCP) was a National Library of Australia and State Library of New South Wales led initiative to microfilm archives and records from the United Kingdom and Ireland relating to Australia and the Pacific.

It was founded in 1945 as a co-operative microfilming scheme under which historical materials of Australian and Pacific interest held in collections in the United Kingdom and Ireland were copied and made available to participating libraries in Australia and elsewhere. 10,419 reels of microfilmed records (dating from 1560 to 1984) were produced.

Filming started in 1948, and continued through to 1993, with the last film issued in 1997. Running for close to 50 years it was one of the largest and longest running microfilming projects in history. It is regarded as the world’s most extensive collaborative copying project.

The AJCP reels are an invaluable resource for researchers and historians in Australia, as it allows access to records that otherwise would have to be viewed in Europe (UK or Ireland). Many of these records are from private archives or the archives of non-government organisations and institutions.

The National Library of Australia holds a complete set of the AJCP reels, and the various State Libraries hold large collections as well (particularly those related to the relevant state). Libraries and archives throughout the world also hold parts of the AJCP, including in New Zealand, the United States of America, Canada, South Africa, and Pacific island countries.

In 1972 the first edition of a handbook was produced, which listed the contents of the reels. The final edition was published in 2005 by the National Library of Australia.

== History ==
=== Background ===
The importance of British and Irish records in documenting the history and development of Australia was recognised by historians in the late nineteenth century. In the formative years from 1788 to the granting of responsible government in 1855, Britain held supreme authority over the Australian colonies. The governor of each colony was subject to direction from the Colonial Office to whom he had to report on the colony’s affairs. The reports detailed every aspect of colonial life and some consider the AJCP microfilms the single most important source for the period.

==== Historical Records of New South Wales (HRNSW) ====
The appointment of James Bonwick as government archivist for New South Wales in 1888 acknowledged the importance of such primary records and systematic copying of British Government records began in earnest. Bonwick began examining historical records of Australian interest in London in 1884. In 1887 he was authorised by the New South Wales Colonial Secretary, Sir Henry Parkes, to transcribe Governors’ despatches from the Public Record Office as part of a drive to collect records for an official centenary history of New South Wales.

After his appointment as Archivist in 1888 until 1902 he compiled what became known as the Bonwick Transcripts. These handwritten transcripts of records held in the Public Record Office, London (now The National Archives) were published in the series Historical Records of New South Wales (1892-1901).

The editor of the Historical Records of New South Wales, F.M. Bladen, was attached to the staff of the State Library of NSW and was Principal Librarian from 1907 to 1912. The Bonwick Transcripts were transferred to the Mitchell Library when it was founded in 1910 as the "Australiana" Wing of the Library.

However, criticism of Bonwick’s Transcripts and the resulting 7 volumes of HRNSW began to surface. Bonwick’s selections were arbitrary. He exercised censorship and excluded material that reflected poorly on individuals whether government officials, the military and free settlers, or drew attention to convict origins.

==== Historical Records of Australia (HRA) ====
The Commonwealth Government took over responsibility for copying documents located in Britain following federation of the Australian states in 1901. Historical Records of Australia under the editorship of Dr. Frederick Watson was published in 33 volumes between 1914 and 1925. However, the method of transcribing documents still resulted in a selective rather than comprehensive coverage required by researchers and publication was suspended after editorial difficulties with the last volume appearing in 1925.

This paved the way for AJCP microfilming project. The development of microfilm in the interwar years facilitated a more extensive and cost-effective copying program. In 1939 the National Library of Australia and State Library of New South Wales announced their intention to microfilm all the records in the Public Record Office in London relating to Australia. This would allow researchers to consult the original records on microfilm in Australia rather than having to travel to the Public Record Office (The National Archives) and other record offices throughout the UK and Ireland. Plans to proceed were thwarted by the outbreak of World War 2 and negotiations resumed towards the end of war.

=== Establishment ===
==== Australian Joint Copying Project (AJCP) ====
The Australian Joint Copying Project (AJCP) was established with the signing of an agreement between the National Library of Australia and the State Library of New South Wales in October 1945. Under the agreement the two libraries agreed to share the task and cost of microfilming material of Australian and Pacific interest held in the United Kingdom and Ireland. The Project was to be administered by the National Library Liaison Officer in London.

C.A Burmester was the first AJCP Officer and he and succeeding staff concentrated on Colonial Office records and other departmental classes at the Public Record Office.

Phyllis Mander-Jones was appointed the first full-time AJCP Officer in 1960. Her appointment signalled a move to identify and copy not only official records but institutional records outside the Public Record Office. This led to the publication of Mander-Jones reference work: Manuscripts in the British Isles relating to Australia, New Zealand and the Pacific (1972), and ultimately the Miscellaneous or M Series.

The State Library of NSW remained a joint administering partner of the Project with the National Library from 1945 to 1988. After that time other State Libraries and institutions acted as partners, sharing the costs of microfilming with the National Library.

== Content ==
=== Scope ===
The scope of the Project is defined in geographical rather than thematic terms with filming covering records related to Australia, New Zealand, the Pacific area and Antarctica. The initial emphasis of the Project focused on filming 19th century official records. Copying continued into the 20th century and included the successor to the Colonial Office, The Dominions Office, documenting Commonwealth relations in the correspondence with the Australian and New Zealand governments up to 1951.

A full time AJCP Officer and an assistant based in the Australian High Commission in London were responsible for selecting and listing records to be filmed. The AJCP Officer’s reports on records under consideration were presented to the major AJCP partners for approval.

=== Collections ===
The AJCP consists of two sets of records: Public Record Office, London (PRO) and collections in other record offices and private collections referred to as the Miscellaneous or M Series. The PRO Series consists of some 7000 microfilm reels, and the M Series a further 3000 reels.

==== PRO Series ====
The first records to be filmed were records in the Colonial Office which house the bulk of British colonial administrative records. These included the governor’s reports or dispatches collected comprehensively with enclosures and minutes, departmental registers and indexes.

Records of other Government departments followed including:

- Admiralty Office – Department responsible for Shipping and the command of the Royal Navy.

Records include masters logbooks and surgeon’s journals for ships on voyages to Australia, ships musters, correspondence of the Admiralty and Medical Departments, and records of the Australia, China and Pacific Stations. Many of these records relate to the exploration of Australia and the Pacific by European explorers including William Bligh and Matthew Flinders.

- Home Office - Department responsible for administration of convicts.

Records include convict trial, imprisonment and transportation registers as well as convict musters and censuses in New South Wales and other convict colonies.

- War Office – Administered British regiments serving in Australia and New Zealand for much of the colonial period.

Records include Muster Books and Pay Lists for British Regiments 1789-1977 (WO 12); Monthly returns (WO 17); Military Pensions (WO 22); and Description and Succession Books (W0 25) relating to the New South Wales Corps and arranged alphabetically, containing such information as each man's description, age, rank, date of enlistment, service, and trade.

Other departments that have been the focus of AJCP filming include:

- Air Ministry
- Audit Office
- Board of Trade
- Cabinet Office
- Dominions Office
- Foreign Office
- Meteorological Office
- Ministry of Transport
- Prison Commission
- Privy Council
- Treasury

==== M Series ====
Filming of institutional records outside the National Archives was a major part of the Australian Joint Copying Project and is known collectively as the Miscellaneous or M Series.

The publication by Phyllis Mander-Jones “Manuscripts in the British Isles relating to Australia, New Zealand and the Pacific” was used as the basis for the Miscellaneous Series. This reference work, sponsored by the National Library of Australia and the Australian National University, uncovered the wealth of source material in institutions such as libraries, archives, museums, county record offices, missionary societies, business archives and collections held in private hands.

Phyllis Mander-Jones was Mitchell Librarian, State Library of New South Wales from 1946-1957. Her final project as Mitchell Librarian was based in London working with the records of the London Missionary Society from 1956. In 1960 she took up the position of AJCP Officer for the State Library of NSW and the National Library of Australia based in London. Whilst not neglecting Government records she pursued private records of Australasian interest throughout the British Isles.

Succeeding AJCP Officer’s followed the example of Phyllis Mander-Jones seeking to achieve a balance between Official records at Public Record Office and the many archival repositories that also contain records of significance to Australia.

Records in the Miscellaneous (M) Series are drawn from the following repositories:

- National Libraries
- University Libraries
- Public Libraries
- Museums
- City and County Record Offices
- Religious Archives
- Business Archives
- Collections in private hands

== Access to the Records ==
=== AJCP Handbooks ===
Access to the microfilms is largely through published AJCP Handbooks. Records which have been filmed are listed and described in the handbooks which consist of eleven parts. Each handbook aims to provide a description of the microfilm at levels of progressively greater detail, linking descriptions with reel numbers.

The National Library of Australia published the first part in 1972. Eleven parts followed which have been revised an updated, and are now available digitally via the Trove website. The handbooks are as follows:

Part 1 General introduction, shelf list in the Public Record Office, London, shelf list of miscellaneous copying

Part 2 Colonial Office, class and piece list

Part 3 Home Office, class and piece list

Part 4 War Office, class and piece list

Part 5 Foreign Office, class and piece list

Part 6 Board of Trade, Treasury, Exchequer and Audit Department, Privy Council, Board of Longitude, class and piece list

Part 7 Admiralty, class and piece list

Part 8 Miscellaneous (M series)

Part 9 Public Record Office personal collections

Part 10 Dominions Office, class, piece and file list

Part 11 Public Record Office, classes filmed in the final five years of the Australian Joint Copying Project.

=== Online Finding Aids ===
The National Library of Australia has created an online portal where the digitised documents can be viewed online.

The portal provides access to information on the AJCP including links to finding aids, digitised content and guidelines to using AJCP content.

The finding aids can be browsed A-Z in two distinct sequences:

- A-Z by UK Government Department (PRO Series)
- A-Z by Organisations, personal papers & UK County Record Offices (M Series)

Detailed descriptions of the records are accompanied by the digitised images. Specific searches on collections, personal, family and organisational names and subjects can also be done through Trove.

== See also ==
- Historical Records of Australia
- Historical Records of New South Wales
- Pacific Manuscripts Bureau
- Trove
