= Phyllis Mander-Jones =

Australian archivist and librarian

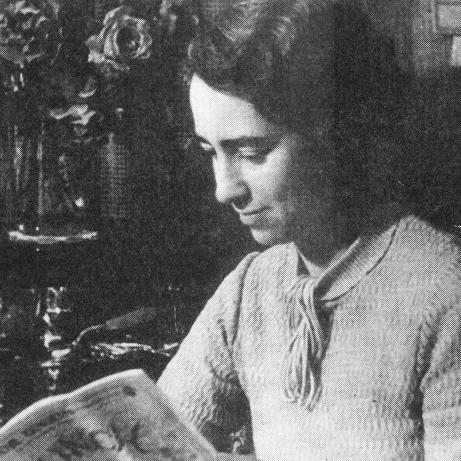
- c 1930
- Born: 2 January 1896; Homebush, New South Wales
- Died: 19 February 1984 (aged 88); Prospect, South Australia
- Education: Bachelor of Arts (Languages), University of Sydney, 1917
- Occupations: Librarian, archivist, bibliographer
- Notable work: Manuscripts in the British Isles Relating to Australia, New Zealand and the Pacific (1972)
- Parent(s): George Mander Jones and Margaret Fleming (née Arnott)
- Honours: Member of the Order of the British Empire (MBE)

Phyllis Mander-Jones MBE (2 January 1896 – 19 February 1984) was an Australian born librarian and archivist who helped establish the archival profession in Australia.

== Early life ==
Phyllis Mander-Jones was born in Homebush, Sydney, Australia, the eldest child of physician George Mander Jones and his wife Margaret Fleming (née Arnott). Both parents had commercial connections: George was the grandson of retailer David Jones, whilst Margaret was the daughter of Australia's leading biscuit manufacturer, William Arnott.

The young Mander-Jones family had two stints in England between 1899 and 1906, before settling in the Sydney suburb of Wahroonga. She and her sister Mildred were educated at nearby Abbotsleigh a private girls' school, while her three brothers: Evan, Burnett and Geoffrey went to Shore School.

On matriculation Phyllis entered the University of Sydney. Residing at Women's College she graduated with a Bachelor of Arts in languages in 1917, awarded honours in German and French. After graduating she was offered a teaching position at Abbotsleigh but instead chose private tutoring.

== Career ==
=== Librarian ===
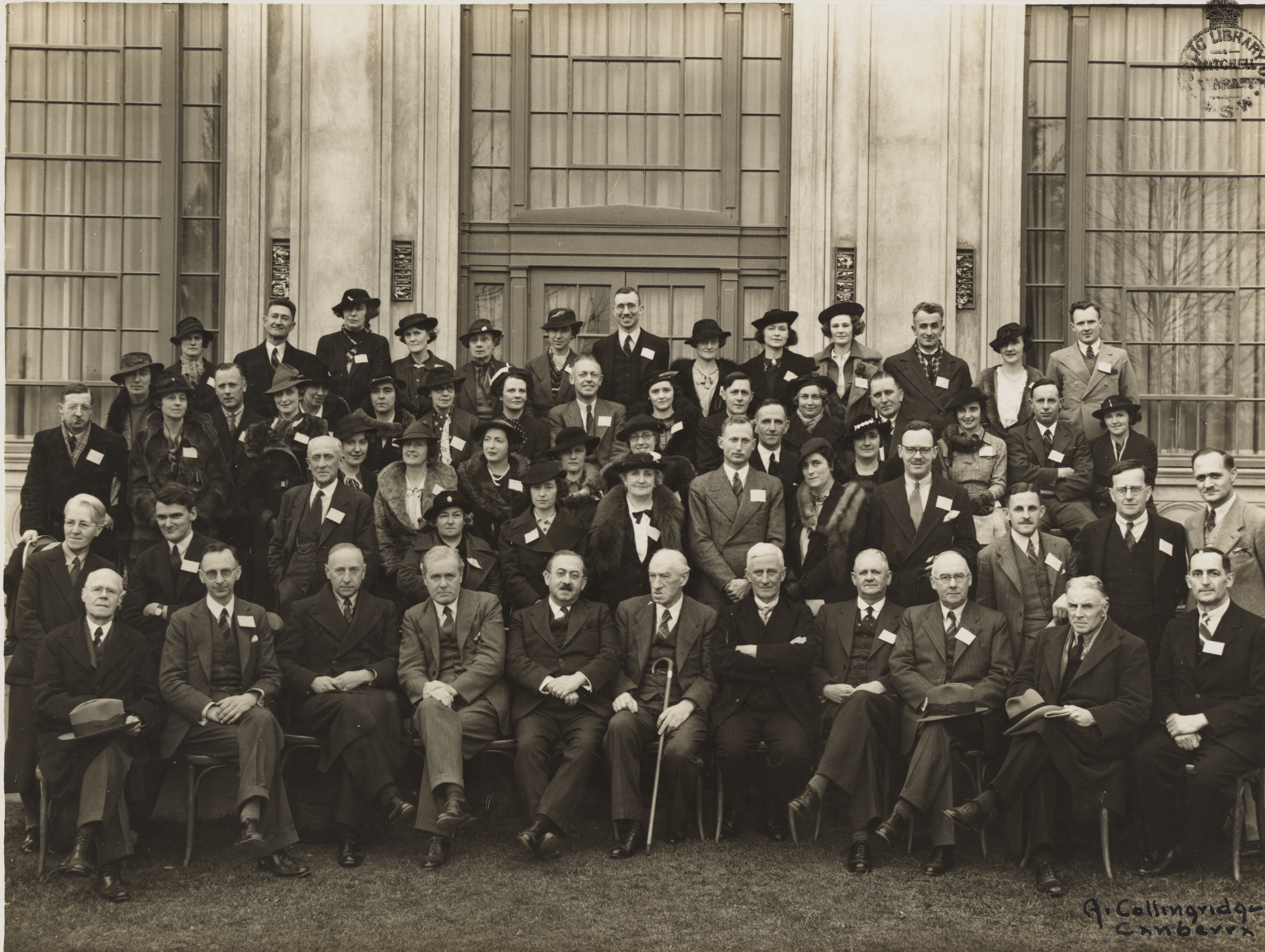
Australian Institute of Librarians inaugural meeting at Canberra in 1937

Mander-Jones was appointed to the staff of the Public Library of NSW (State Library of NSW) in 1925. She began as a library assistant and worked her way through the ranks of the organisation becoming a qualified librarian in 1933 and appointed to the position of Bibliographer in 1941. Her bibliographical work included lecturing on historical bibliography in the library schools of the early 1940s.

1942 saw her appointment to the Mitchell Library. Coinciding with war service her energies were redirected, being employed by the Department of the Army in censorship. Her proficiency in languages was an asset and utilised between 1942 and 1945. Her bibliographic skills were also called upon under the direction of Mitchell Librarian, Ida Leeson, for the Allied Geographic Section.

==== Mitchell Librarian 1946–1957 ====
Mander-Jones was appointed Mitchell Librarian in November 1946 and began the work of modernising the library in the wake of the difficult war years.

Drawing on her experience in bibliography she established standards in recording collections, created finding aids to assist researchers, and giving due care to the processing of original materials: manuscripts, pictures and maps.

She was aware of the need to continue building the Library's collections as well as promoting its valuable resources. To this end she acquired significant original materials such as records of the Supreme Court of New South Wales and the second collection of Macarthur papers. She publicised the library's significant holdings via print publications as well as addressing conferences, public forums and community groups.

Perhaps her greatest challenge was managing a library that also functioned as the State Archive. From its inception, the Mitchell Library acted as the government record repository (documents no longer required in the administration of government departments being transferred to it). The Library no longer had the resources required to process or store the material and in November 1953 the State Archives became a separate department of the Library. She was to play a key role in what was to become the Archives Office of NSW.

Mander-Jones' final project as Mitchell Librarian was based in London, working with the records of the London Missionary Society and other papers. Based there from 6 November 1956 to 18 March 1958, she resigned her position as Mitchell Librarian and was then appointed the State Library's Liaison Officer in London.

=== Archivist ===
Mander-Jones helped lay the foundations of the archival profession in Australia establishing the archives section of the Library Association of Australia which in 1975 became the Australian Society of Archivists. She co-edited the inaugural issue of the society's journal Archives and Manuscripts in 1955, which continues to this day. She attended the first congress of the International Council on Archives in 1948 and the following year reported on the state of NSW archives to a conference of Commonwealth and State authorities.

=== Australian Joint Copying Project ===
After her appointment in London as the State Library's Liaison Officer (1958–1960) based at the Office of the Agent-General for NSW she embarked on the major project of her career: the Australian Joint Copying Project (AJCP).

Taking up the position of AJCP officer for the Public Library of NSW and the National Library of Australia from July 1960, Mander-Jones continued the work of the project initiated in 1945 for the copying of records of Australian and Pacific interest held in repositories in the United Kingdom.

Then, in 1964, she was appointed to direct the project under the joint administration of the Australian National University and the National Library of Australia. This led to the publication of her major life's work: Manuscripts in the British Isles Relating to Australia, New Zealand, and the Pacific (1972).

== Legacy ==
In 1996, the Australian Society of Archivists introduced a suite of awards in her honour. The awards are presented annually at the Society's national conference.

== Honours and awards ==
- 1971: Member of the Order of the British Empire (MBE) in recognition of her contribution to Australian history
- 1963: Fellow of the Library Association of Australia
- 1976: Australian Society of Archivists honorary member
- 1981: Henry Charles Lennox Anderson Award (Library Association of Australia for outstanding service to the library and information profession)

== Later life ==
In retirement, Mander-Jones returned to Australia and pursued her interest in bibliography, contributing most notably to J.C. Beaglehole's The Life of Captain Cook (1974) as well as researching the family history of her Arnott ancestors.

She spent the final years of her life in South Australia and died at Prospect, Adelaide on 19 February 1984.

== See also ==
- Australian Joint Copying Project
- Ida Leeson
- Jean Fleming Arnot
- Pacific Manuscripts Bureau
- State Library of New South Wales
