= Pacific Manuscripts Bureau =

Non-profit organisation preserving documents of the Pacific Islands

The Pacific Manuscripts Bureau is a non-profit organisation sponsored by an international consortium of libraries specialising in Pacific research. The Pacific Manuscripts Bureau was formed in 1968 to copy archives, manuscripts and rare printed material relating to the Pacific Islands. The aim of the Bureau is to help with long-term preservation of the documentary heritage of the Pacific Islands and to make it accessible.

== History ==
=== Background ===
Pacific scholar Harry E. Maude, Department of Pacific History at the Australian National University from 1958, was the first to conceptualise the workings of the Bureau when he discussed the need for interlibrary co-operation in the copying of documents of Pacific interest for Pacific researchers with Dr Floyd Cammack, University of Hawaii in December 1962. Dr Cammack proposed an association of Pacific research libraries and contacted potential members, winning support from Gordon Richardson, Mitchell Librarian and Principal Librarian of the NSW Public Library. In 1966 Richardson pursued the idea of a joint copying scheme and with the University of Hawaii requested Maude produce a paper to make the scheme a reality.

Maude's Paper entitled: The Documentary Basis for Pacific Studies: a Report on Progress and Desiderata, was released in March 1967. It proposed setting up a Pacific Islands Manuscripts Clearing Centre to identify and obtain microfilm copies of unpublished documents on the Pacific Islands.

=== Establishment ===
Maude's Paper recommended the proposed Pacific Islands Manuscripts Clearing Centre be established at the Australian National University (ANU), the only institution in the world at that time with a Department of Pacific History. The Australian National University supported Maude's proposal and invited the National Library of Australia, National Library of New Zealand, the Mitchell Library (State Library of New South Wales), and the University of Hawaii to sponsor and establish the Centre effective 1 January 1968.

The Pacific Islands Manuscripts Clearing Centre was declared fully operational under the name Pacific Manuscripts Bureau on 1 July 1968 with Robert Langdon, then editor of the Pacific Islands Monthly, appointed to manage the Bureau.

== Objectives ==
The aim of the Bureau is to help with long-term preservation of the documentary heritage of the Pacific Islands and to make it accessible.

=== Pacific Islands Archives ===
To this end the Bureau undertakes fieldwork in the Pacific Islands to copy archives, manuscripts and rare printed material, particularly when the material is in danger of loss or destruction. Island based records have been identified as most at risk due to climatic factors and lack of trained staff to care for them. Fieldwork reports can be found on the Bureau's website.

=== International Pacific Island Collections ===
The Bureau has an interest in copying archives relating to the Pacific in major collections throughout the world, including member libraries. An earlier co-operative microfilming project, The Australian Joint Copying Project, achieved some success. In its 45-year history it microfilmed a large number of Pacific manuscripts in the United Kingdom, many identified by Mitchell Librarian, Phyllis Mander-Jones during the 1960s.

== Membership ==
The Bureau is based at the Australian National University in the College of Asia and the Pacific and is sponsored by an international consortium of Pacific research libraries. Each member Library has the complete PMB Collection.

The Libraries are:

- Mitchell Library, State Library of NSW, Sydney
- National Library of Australia, Canberra
- The Library, Australian National University, Canberra
- Alexander Turnbull Library, Wellington
- University of Auckland Library
- Hocken Library, University of Otago, Dunedin
- Library of the University of Hawaii, Honolulu
- Library of the University of California, San Diego
- Yale University Library, New Haven
- University of Michigan Library, Ann Arbor
- University of Bergen Library, Bergen
- University of the South Pacific
- National University of Samoa, Apia

== Collections ==
=== Content ===
The Pacific Manuscripts Bureau collection is the most extensive collection of non-government primary documentation on the Pacific Islands available to researchers. The Archive includes in excess of 4000 microfilm reels comprising a diverse range of records, copied from following documents:

- Community associations and NGO's
- Genealogies and family records
- Grammars, vocabularies, dictionaries
- Letters diaries notebooks
- Mission and church records
- Newspapers, newsletters and other serials
- Papers of political parties, trade unions, environmental organisations, women's groups
- Papers of regional organisations
- Plantation, mining, trading, shipping and other business records
- Scientific and medical papers

=== Format ===
The Pacific Manuscripts Bureau microfilm collection is divided into three series:

==== Manuscript Series (PMB) ====
Unpublished records of organisations and people associated with the Pacific Islands. Records include manuscripts, diaries, minutes, correspondence, linguistic materials and research papers.

==== Printed Document Series (PMB Doc) ====
Published material including newspapers, newsletters and other serials published by organisations with interests in the Pacific Islands.

==== Oceania Marist Province Archives Series (OMPA) ====
Records of the Catholic Church in islands of the Western Pacific. Includes all six dioceses: Tonga, Samoa and Tokelau, Wallis and Futuna, Port Vila, Nouméa, Suva. The records are indexed in the guide: The Catholic Church in the Western Pacific: a guide to records on microfilm. The catalogue has been digitised and can be accessed on the Bureau's website.

The Pacific Manuscripts Bureau collection also includes audio and photographic collections.

== Access to the Records ==
=== Online catalogue ===
Access to the collection is via the Pacific Manuscripts Bureau online catalogue. This can be freely searched on the Internet by researchers to find relevant documents. Most of these documents are microfilm copies of originals held in archives and libraries throughout the Pacific. However, the Bureau is in the process of digitising its microfilm collections. Member libraries have access to these digital collections via the PMB catalogue.

=== Finding Aids ===
The Bureau publishes finding aids to assist researchers in accessing PMB collections. These include subject guides and country specific guides including Fiji, Vanuatu and the Cook Islands.

=== Publications ===
The newsletter, Pambu, has been published since the Bureau's inception in 1968. Pambu reports on the Bureau's microfilming projects and fieldtrips as well as advertising books on the Pacific and publishing articles by Pacific scholars.

== See also ==
- Australian Joint Copying Project
