= Historical Records of New South Wales =

The Historical Records of New South Wales (HRNSW) is a series of books published by the NSW Government Printer between 1892-1901 compiling information from official sources on the history of NSW and Australia. The HRNSW comprises 7 volumes from the period of Captain Cook 1762-1780 (volume 1, part 1) to the Governorship of William Bligh and part way through the Governorship of Lachlan Macquarie 1809-1811 (volume 7). The volumes are also available online.

== Background ==
The importance of British records in documenting the history and development of Australia was recognised by historians in the late nineteenth century. Several Australian writers and historians had drawn public attention to the extensive original records concerning Australia held in the Public Record Office, London, and other repositories of official records in the UK.

The Historical Records of New South Wales (HRNSW) came about because most of the sources of Australian history after settlement, its maritime exploration and colonisation were located in the United Kingdom. The volumes include relevant information from official documents from the time of James Cook, Philip Gidley King, Major Grose and Captain Paterson, John Hunter, William Bligh and Lachlan Macquarie.

=== James Bonwick ===
James Bonwick began transcribing Australian documents in 1887 and with funding from colonial governments, persevered with this work for 17 years. It was these transcripts that provided much of the material reproduced in HRNSW.

In 1887 he was authorised by the New South Wales Colonial Secretary, Sir Henry Parkes, to transcribe Governors’ despatches from the Public Record Office as part of a drive to collect records for an official centenary history of New South Wales.

Officially appointed as NSW Government Archivist in 1888 until 1902 he compiled what became known as the Bonwick Transcripts. These handwritten transcripts of records held in the Public Record Office, London (now The National Archives) were published in the series Historical Records of New South Wales (1892-1901).

These transcripts and publications had great value for researchers, students and general readers who had no chance of seeing the original documents in Britain.

== Editors of HRNSW ==
=== Alexander Britton ===
The first editor to be appointed was journalist, Alexander Britton. He was sub-editor of the Melbourne Argus, and later the Sydney Morning Herald. In 1890 he was engaged by the Government of New South Wales to complete the official "History of New South Wales," at it was then known, the first volume of which had been edited by Mr. G. B. Barton . After his untimely death in 1892, Frank Murcott Bladen was appointed.

=== Frank Murcott Bladen ===
Bladen then assumed duties on what later became known as the 7 volume Historical Records on New South Wales. Bladen was transferred to the Public Library of New South Wales in 1896 (State Library of NSW) where he continued the work until the Records project ceased in 1902 for financial reasons.

Bladen was appointed head of the Library’s lending branch before being appointed Principal Librarian from 1907-1912. The Bonwick Transcripts were transferred to the Mitchell Library during this period when it was founded in 1910 as the “Australiana” Wing of the Library.

== Structure of the HRNSW ==
The Historical Records of New South Wales comprise 7 volumes as follows:

- Volume 1, pt. 1. Cook, 1762-1780.
- Facsimiles of charts to accompany Vol. 1, part 1.
- Volume 1, pt. 2. Phillip, 1783-1792.
- Volume 2. Grose and Paterson, 1793-1795 (published 1893).
- Volume 3. Hunter, 1796-1799 (published 1895).
- Volume 4. Hunter and King, 1800-1802.
- Volume 5. King, 1803-1805. (Published 1897)
- Volume 6. King and Bligh, 1806-1807, 1808.
- Volume 7. Bligh and Macquarie, 1809, 1810, 1811.

== See also ==
- Australian Joint Copying Project
- Historical Records of Australia
- History of Australia (1788-1850)
