= List of libraries in New South Wales =

This is a list of libraries in New South Wales, Australia.

- State Library of New South Wales

== Academic libraries ==
=== School of Arts ===
- Sydney Mechanics' School of Arts

For a list of now defunct school of arts, see Mechanics' institutes of Australia.

=== Universities ===
- Macquarie University Library (Macquarie University)
- Dixson Library (University of New England)
- UNSW Library (University of New South Wales)
- Auchmuty Library (University of Newcastle)
- University of Notre Dame Australia Library (University of Notre Dame Australia)
- University of Sydney Libraries (University of Sydney)
- UTS Library (University of Technology Sydney)
- UOW Library (University of Wollongong)
- Charles Sturt University Library (Charles Sturt University)

== Public Libraries ==
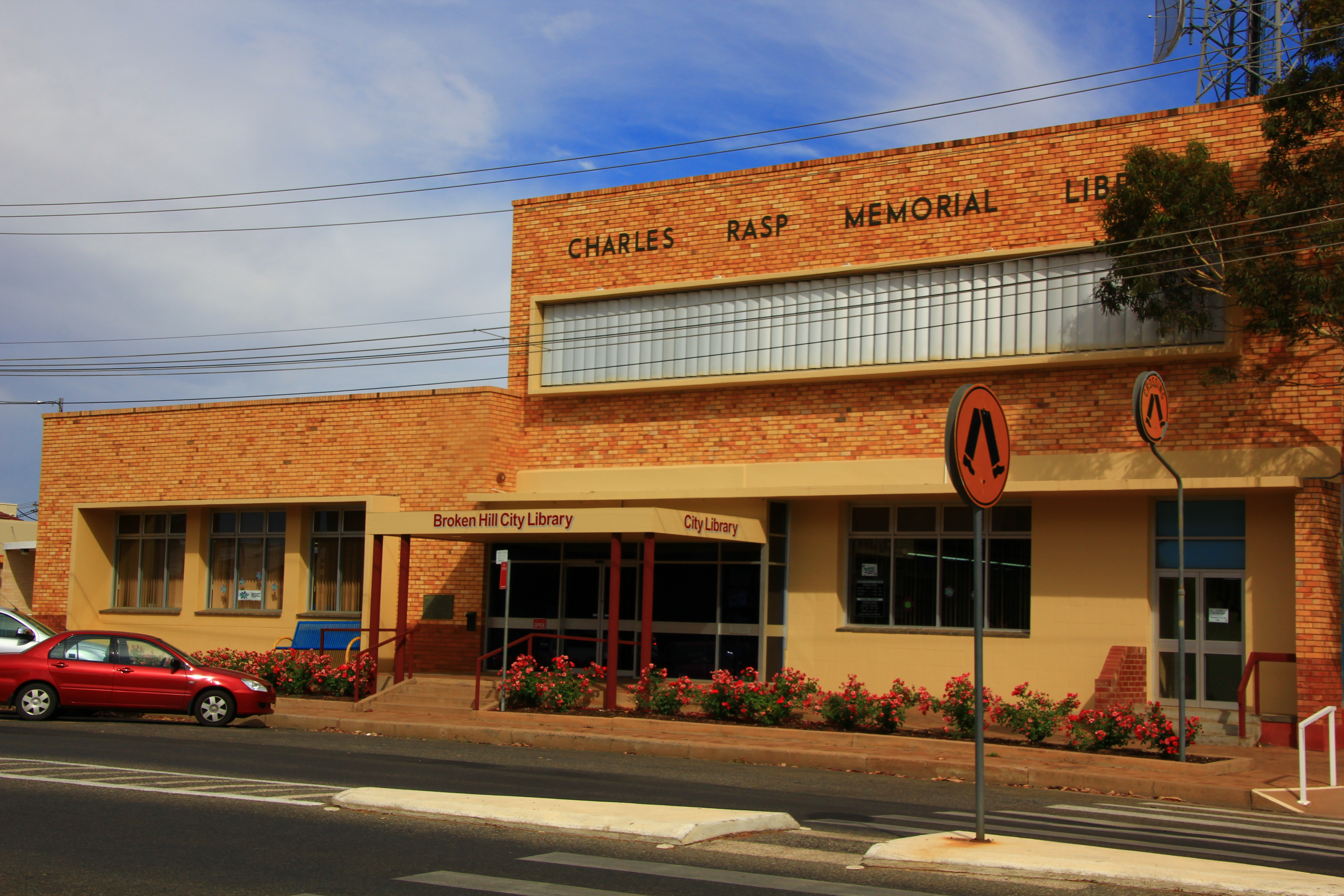
Broken Hill City Library

The public libraries in New South Wales are operated by local government area councils, in some cases cooperatively as "regional libraries". There are 89 library services which operate more than 350 public libraries across the state. All NSW libraries are governed by the Library Act 1939 and managed financially by the State Library of New South Wales.

=== Greater Sydney ===
- Bayside Library (includes a library of things) (Bayside)
- Burwood Library (Burwood)
- Camden Council Library Services (Camden Council)
- Campbelltown City Library Service (City of Campbelltown)
- Canterbury Bankstown Library and Knowledge Centres (City of Canterbury Bankstown)
- City of Canada Bay Libraries (City of Canada Bay)
- City of Parramatta Libraries (City of Parramatta)
- City of Ryde Libraries (City of Ryde)
- City of Sydney Library (City of Sydney)
- Cumberland Library (Cumberland City Council)
- Fairfield City Open Libraries (City of Fairfield)
- Georges River Library (includes a library of things) (Georges River Council)
- Hornsby Shire Library & Information Service (Hornsby Shire)
- Inner West Council Library & History (Inner West)
- Ku-ring-gai Library (Ku-ring-gai Council)
- Liverpool City Library (City of Liverpool)
- Shorelink Library Network - includes the Barry O’Keefe Library (Mosman Council), Stanton Library (North Sydney Council) and Lane Cove Library (Lane Cove Council)
- Northern Beaches Libraries (Northern Beaches)
- Penrith City Library (City of Penrith)
- Randwick City Library Service (City of Randwick)
- Strathfield Library & Innovation Hub (Municipality of Strathfield)
- Sutherland Shire Libraries & Information Service (Sutherland Shire)
- The Hills Shire Library Service (The Hills Shire)
- Waverley Library (Waverley Council)
- Willoughby City Library (City of Willoughby)
- Woollahra Libraries (Woollahra)

=== Regional ===
- Albury City Libraries (City of Albury)
- Armidale Regional Council Library (Armidale)
- Balranald Library (Shire of Balranald)
- Bathurst Library (Bathurst)
- Bega Valley Shire Library (Bega Valley Shire)
- Berrigan Shire Library Service (Berrigan Shire)
- Big Sky Libraries (Moree Plains Shire)
- Blacktown City Libraries (City of Blacktown)
- Blue Mountains Library (City of Blue Mountains)
- Broken Hill City Library (City of Broken Hill)
- Campaspe Libraries (Shire of Campaspe)
- Central Coast Council Library (Central Coast Council)
- Cessnock City Libraries (City of Cessnock)
- Cobar Shire & TAFE Library (Cobar Shire)
- Coffs Harbour Libraries (Coffs Harbour)
- Deniliquin Library (Edward River)
- Eurobodalla Shire Library Service (Eurobodalla Shire)
- Glen Innes Severn Public & TAFE Library (Glenn Innes Severn)
- Goulburn Mulwaree Library (Goulburn Mulwaree Council)
- Grenfell Public Library (Weddin Mountains)
- Gunnedah Shire Library (Gunnedah Shire)
- Hawkesbury Library Service (City of Hawkesbury)
- Hilltops Council Library Service (Hilltops Council)
- Inverell Shire Public Library (Inverell Shire)
- Kempsey Shire Library (Kempsey Shire) (part of the Mid North Coast Cooperative Library Service duo, with Port Macquarie-Hastings Library)
- Kiama Library (Electoral district of Kiama) (part of the South Coast Cooperative Libraries duo, with Shoalhaven Libraries)
- Lachlan Shire Library Service (Lachlan Shire)
- Lake Mac Libraries (City of Lake Macquarie)
- Lithgow City Council Libraries (City of Lithgow)
- Maitland Library (City of Maitland)
- Mid Western Regional Council Library Service (Mid-Western Regional Council)
- MidCoast Libraries (Midcoast Council)
- Murray River Libraries (Murray River Council)
- Muswellbrook Shire Libraries (Muswellbrook Shire)
- Nambucca Shire Libraries (Nambucca Valley)
- Newcastle Libraries (City of Newcastle) (manages Newcastle Region Libraries)
- Oberon Library (Oberon Council)
- Parkes Shire Library Services (Parkes Shire)
- Port Macquarie-Hastings Library (Port Macquarie-Hastings Council) (part of the Mid North Coast Cooperative Library Service duo, with Kempsey Shire Library)
- Port Stephens Library (Port Stephens Council) (Part of Newcastle Region Libraries)
- Queanbeyan-Palerang Libraries (Queanbeyan-Palerang Regional Council)
- Richmond – Upper Clarence Regional Library (Richmond Valley Council)
- Shellharbour City Libraries (City of Shellharbour)
- Shoalhaven Libraries (part of the South Coast Cooperative Libraries duo, with Kiama Library)
- Singleton Public Library (Singleton Council)
- Snowy Monaro Regional Library (Snowy Monaro Regional Council)
- Tenterfield Public Library (Tenterfield Shire)
- Upper Hunter Shire Libraries (Upper Hunter Shire)
- Upper Lachlan Shire Library Service (Upper Lachlan Shire)
- Wagga Wagga City Library (City of Wagga Wagga)
- Wentworth Shire Library (Wentworth Shire)
- Wingecarribee Public Library (Wingecarribee Shire)
- Wollondilly Library Service (Wollondilly Shire)
- Wollongong City Library (City of Wollongong)
- Yass Valley Library Service (Yass Valley)

=== Regional Library Cooperatives ===
- Central Northern Regional Library (Primarily managed by Tamworth Regional Council, as well as Gwydir Shire, Liverpool Plains Shire Council, Narrabri Shire, Uralla Shire, and Walcha Shire)
- Central West Libraries (Blayney Shire, Cabonne Council, Cowra Shire, Forbes Shire, City of Orange)
- Clarence Regional Library (Bellingen Shire and Clarence Valley)
- Macquarie Regional Library (Dubbo Regional Council, Narromine Shire and Warrumbungle Shire)
- North Western Library (Bogan Shire, Gilgandra Shire Coonamble Shire, and Warren Shire)
- Richmond Tweed Regional Library ( Ballina Shire, Byron Shire, City of Lismore, and Tweed Shire)
- Riverina Regional Library (Berrigan Shire, Bland Shire, Coolamon Shire, Cootamundra–Gundagai Regional Council, Federation Council, Greater Hume Shire, Junee Shire, Leeton Shire, Lockhart Shire, Snowy Valleys Council, and Temora Shire)
- Western Riverina Libraries (Carrathool Shire, City of Griffith, Hay Shire, Murrumbidgee Council, and Narrandera Shire)

== Subscription libraries ==
- Australian Subscription Library (defunct)

== Special libraries ==
- The Women's Library
- Jessie Street National Women's Library

=== GLAM libraries ===
- Edmund and Joanna Capon Research Library (Art Gallery of New South Wales)
- National Art School Library
- Australian Museum Research Library

=== Legal libraries ===
- New South Wales Parliamentary Library
- Sydney Mechanics' School of Arts

== See also ==
- Library Act 1939
