= 2024 Cumberland book ban =

Same-sex parenting book ban in Sydney, Australia

The book that initiated the ban.

In 2024, a controversial fifteen-day ban of same-sex parenting books from the eight libraries in the Cumberland City Council's public library system in Sydney, New South Wales occurred. The ban was enacted by the council on 1 May and was rescinded on 15 May. The ban led to a wider discussion of book censorship in Australian libraries.

== Motion ==
During a Cumberland City Council meeting on 1 May 2024, councillor and former mayor Steve Christou requested that the motion "That Council adopt the 'Library Strategy 2024 - 2027' as outlined in Attachment 1 of this report" be amended with "subject to the following being undertaken: That Council take immediate action to rid same-sex parents books/materials in Council's library service". The amendment was made without prior communication with Cumberland Public Library staff.

Christou, who had previously called for bans to drag storytime and Welcome to Country rituals, claimed to have received text messages from "distraught local parents" who had found the book "Same-Sex Parents" by Holly Duhig in the junior non-fiction section. Five copies of the book had been in Cumberland libraries since 2019. Christou claimed the book was sexualising children, chanting 'Hands off our kids'. Christou justified the motion by saying he was speaking for the Cumberland community.

The vote passed, with six councillors (Christou, Paul Garrard, Helen Hughes, Greg Cummings, Michael Zaiter, and Mohamad Hussein) voting in favour of the ban and five councillors (Ken Huang, Diane Colman, Glenn Elmore, Kun Suman Saha and mayor Lisa Lake) voting against the ban. Councillor Colman was visibly shaken, saying she could not believe Cumberland Council had voted to discriminate against same-sex families and banning books. She vowed to bring a recission motion to overturn the decision. Deputy Mayor Ola Hamed had left the chamber so did not vote, saying she was a "longstanding advocate for social justice" but was concerned after receiving death threats after an earlier debate related to drag queen storytimes. Four councillors were not present.

Councillor Colman immediately commenced a campaign to overturn the ban, posting "All families are welcome in Cumberland. Book banning is not ok." Labor councillor Kun Huang announced the ban on social media, saying "This kind of censorship by politicians should have no place in Australia."

== Response ==
=== Community ===
A petition was created on 2 May by Cumberland resident Caroline Staples calling for the council to rescind the motion. Staples had family members who were LGBT. The plan was to present the petition on 15 May. The petition gained over 10,000 signatures in 24 hours. By 15 May, the petition had over 40,000 signatures, though Christou said only 2400 of the signatories lived in Cumberland.

Christou was mocked after he admitted that he had not read the book before banning it.

Sydney author Will Kostakis called the decision "a dangerous precedent."

=== Politicians ===
NSW Arts Minister John Graham told the council that the ban could affect their funding and that it violated the freedom of access to information guidelines under the Library Act 1939 which states that materials "should not be excluded from a public library on moral, political, racial, religious, sexist, language, or other grounds" and threatened that the council could risk its library funding. Christou responded "If the government wants to take away funding from one of the most socially disadvantaged communities in NSW because their democratically elected council stood up for the values which they believe represents their local community, well shame on them." Graham also criticised Christou after Christou admitted he had not read the book.

NSW premier Chris Minns called the ban "ridiculous" and "a joke" and suggested the move may have been timed because of an upcoming election.

Inner West Mayor Darcy Byrne criticised the ban by saying "If someone as deliberately divisive as Councillor Steve Christou thinks the Inner West is too inclusive and respectful, we wear that as a badge of honour" and called the vote "pathetic".

NSW Health Minister Ryan Park disapproved of the ban, saying, "If we're going to have a council operate and start to become a censorship body, then we will have a look at the public funds that we provide them. I don't think it's a wise idea for a council to start censoring what their local residents and ratepayers choose to read or not."

Labor MP Rose Jackson wrote on Twitter "Stop being weirdly obsessed with how other ppl live their private lives and thinking you look tough punching down on minorities. It's pathetic."

=== Organisations ===
The Australian Library and Information Association (ALIA) released a statement on 8 May promoting freedom of information, and said they were "appalled" by the ban, and cited APLA-ALIA Standards and Guidelines for Australian Public Libraries, "public library collections should cover a wide range of popular topics, express a variety of viewpoints and cultural understandings, and represent a diversity of people, places, events, issues and ideas." On 9 May, the CEO of ALIA Trish Hepworth met with ABC News and said that the ban was part of a trend of increasing attempts to ban books in libraries, following similar trends in the USA, particularly regarding LGBT content. ALIA later released a further statement saying they had pro-bono lawyers helping write to the Cumberland Council discussing legal concerns relating to the ban.

The State Library of New South Wales made a statement supporting the Arts Minister and criticising Cumberland City Council's decision: "It's up to readers to choose what they want to read." which the State Library of Queensland also supported.

National and State Libraries Australasia released a statement discussing the importance of diversity in library collections and of libraries as "public spaces for discovery and access to information" and support of ALIAs initial statement.

The Council of Australian University Librarians called on the council to reverse the decision, saying they were "deeply concerned."

NSW Public Libraries Association president Romola Hollywood stated the Cumberland City Council's decision was against the Library Council of New South Wales guidelines for freedom of access to information as per the NSW Library Act 1939 and recognised "the important work that council-run public libraries across NSW undertake each and every day to provide opportunities for people of all backgrounds and identities to have the freedom to read and access information in safety and without judgment."

Equality Australia representative Ghassan Kassisieh said "The council seems to be clinging to some kind of backward stereotype that people in Western Sydney are bigoted and can't decide for themselves what to borrow from the local library."

Anti-Discrimination NSW president Helen McKenzie called the ban "a hurtful and divisive act which impacts them and their children".

BookLife Publishing, the publisher of the book, released a statement, stating that the book, as part of a broader series, covers topics essential for children's understanding during their formative years, including wellbeing and family life. To demonstrate the appropriateness of the content, the publisher also publicly released a digital copy of the book.

== Repeal ==
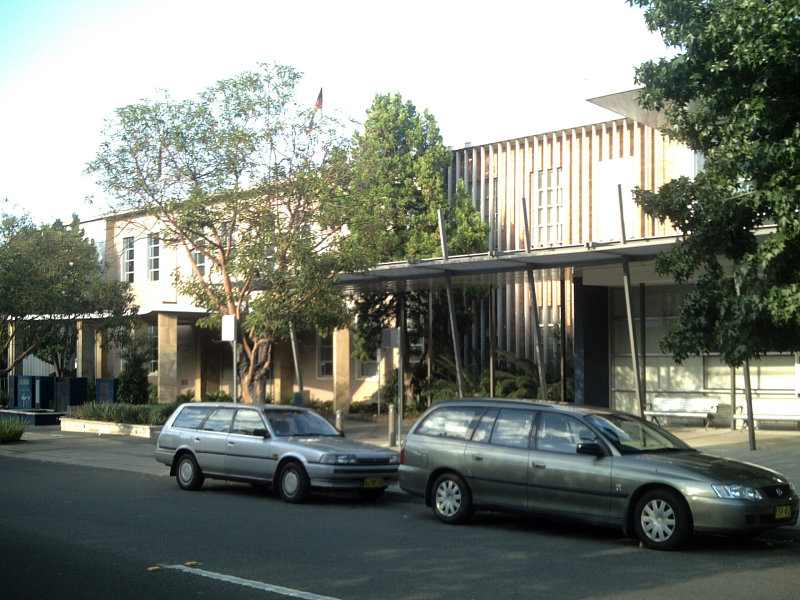
Chambers of Cumberland Council, Merrylands

On 9 May, Labor Cumberland councillors Diane Colman, Sabrin Farouqui, Kun Huang and Suman Saha lodged a motion to "alter or rescind the resolution". A second meeting was then scheduled for 15 May. On the day, the Merrylands Library closed early at 4pm as a safety precaution.

People who registered to speak at the meeting included Staples, who led the petition, and Cumberland librarian Julie Thomas, who criticised the council for making the decision without any communication with library staff. Former MP Craig Kelly spoke in favour of free speech. Lisa Lake threatened to remove members of the public in the gallery for continuously interrupting speakers. Because of the lateness of the new proposal, the discussion of the ban was not until the end of the meeting in General Matters.

The council debate lasted over four hours before voting to reverse the ban just before 10.45pm. The motion was passed with twelve members for, two against, and one absent. Only Christou and Eddy Sarkis voted against reversing the ban. Though Sarkis, who initially supported the ban, stated, "I read the book and have come to the conclusion that nothing sexualises children in this book".

Huang and Farooqui put forth a motion to replace the previous amendment to Cumberland Council Library Strategy for 2024 to 2027 with one stating that all books should be catalogued by national library guidelines, which would include Duhig's book being in the junior section. After the motion to reverse the ban had passed, Christou put forward a motion to restrict same-sex parenting books to the adult section of the library, which failed. Following this, Paul Garrard put forward a motion to have the restriction placed only on Duhig's book, which also failed.

=== Protests ===
On 15 May, by 6pm, around 200 protesters from both sides had gathered at the council chambers – One side represented the local queer community and the other a religiously conservative group supporting the ban, who held signs such as "Leave The Kids Alone!" and "Pee Off Back To Newtown". Counter to the signs in favour of the book ban were signs against the ban such as "Diversity Is Our Strength" and "Books Save Lives"

Protestors supporting the rescinding of the ban were led by Pride in Protest. Six police officers and two security guards were stationed inside the council chambers. Most of the protesters had left by 8.30pm. Moreover, over 50,000 people from Cumberland and other communities were signatories to a petition on Equality Australia's website to have the ban overturned.

== Aftermath ==
Since the repeal, the Cumberland book ban is often brought up in other discussions of possible banned books in Australia such as a proposed book ban in Albany Libraries in Western Australia.

Salina Khao, the senior coordinator of library services at Cumberland Library, was shortlisted for the inaugural NSW Library & Information Excellence Award due to her management during the ban and the "extremely trying and unusual circumstances, including high media scrutiny."

Two years after the attempted ban, the Library Amendment (Freedom to Collect) Bill 2026 was passed, which strengthened public libraries ability to fight censorship attempts. The Cumberland book ban was directly mentioned as example of recent censorship attempts which made the amendment necessary.

== See also ==
- LGBT rights in Australia
- LGBT rights in New South Wales
- Same-sex marriage in Australia
- Censorship in Australia
