= Newcastle Libraries =

Public library system in Australia

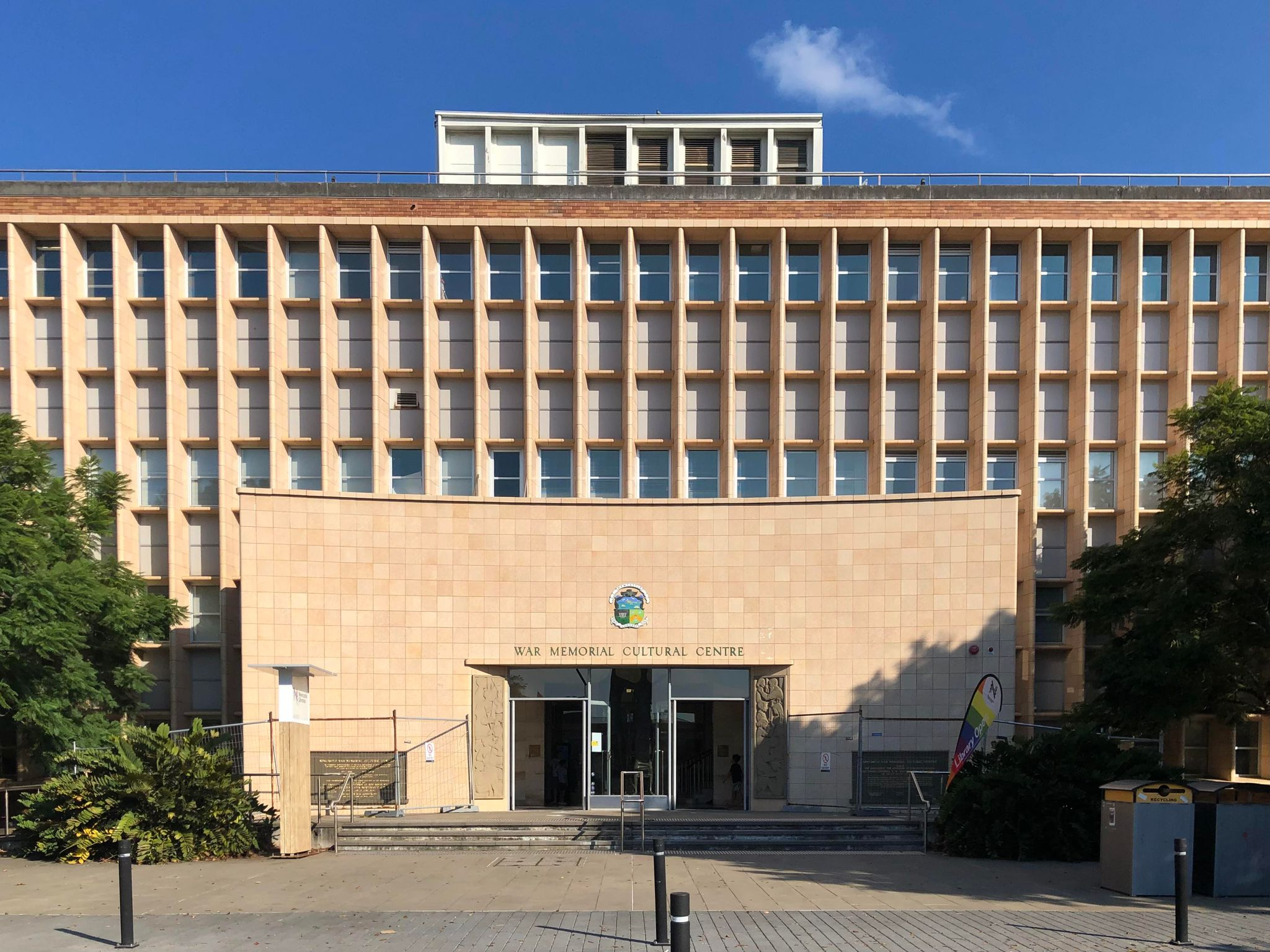
- The City branch of the library
- 32.929436°S 151.772465°E
- Location: Newcastle, New South Wales, Australia
- Type: Public Library
- Established: 1945 (informally) 21 October 1957 (officially)
- Branches: 11 (Adamstown, Beresfield, Digital Library, Hamilton, Lambton, Local History Library, Mayfield, Newcastle (City), New Lambton, Stockton, Wallsend)

Collection
- Items collected: 1,049,182

Access and use
- Circulation: 1,752,373 (2024-2025)
- Population served: 265,671
- Members: 170,875 (2024-2025)

Other information
- Director: Julie Baird
- Employees: 106
- Public transit access: Newcastle Transport
- Website: newcastlelibraries.com.au

Newcastle Libraries are the public library system in Newcastle, Australia. They are the second biggest lending library system in New South Wales by collection, following Richmond-Tweed Libraries. Newcastle Libraries is connected with the Newcastle Museum.

== History ==
Demand for a free public library in Newcastle had been around since the 1920s and gained traction in the 1930s as part of the free Library movement, of which the Newcastle branch was described as "most active and well organised". In the late 1930s, the Newcastle Council had begun plans for a free library, and the Newcastle School of Arts (which at the time had a subscription library) had offered space in their building for one, but plans were put on hold until the mid 1940s as resources were being prioritised for World War II.

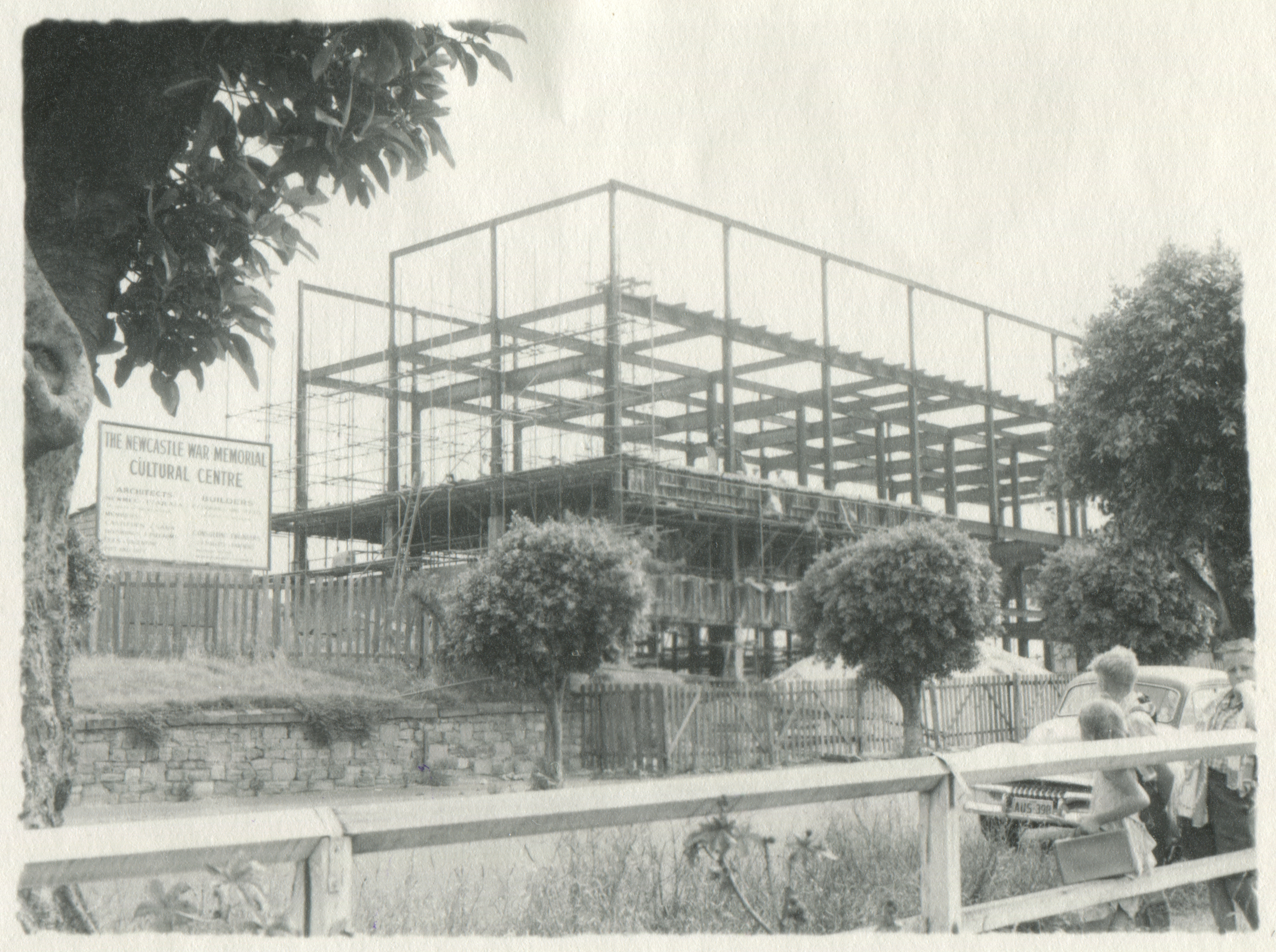
Construction of the Newcastle Cultural Centre and Library, 1955

In 1944, Newcastle became on of the first councils to adopt the Library Act 1939. The Newcastle Library informally began the next year in 1945 after Roland Pope left in his will a collection of paintings and rare books to the City of Newcastle, with the wish that they be used to start a public library and art gallery.

The Newcastle City Library officially opened in the Cultural Centre on 21 October 1957. The library initially functioned solely as a reference library, the collection built out primarily of donations, such as those by C. Barrington Darley, a donation of the entirety of the Women's Club's children's library, and eventually the property of the School of Arts when it closed in 1964.

== Collections ==
Newcastle Libraries have a collaborative collection with Dungog Libraries and Port Stephens Libraries at Raymond Terrace, Tomaree (Salamander Bay), and the Port Stephens mobile library. They are united as Newcastle Region Libraries and share their collections. Newcastle also provides technical and IT support, as some Port Stephens libraries are very small with only one staff member.

=== Rare books collection ===
The rare books collection is housed on the first floor and locked, with items available to view on request. It includes part of the original donations by Roland Pope, rare monographs by John Gould including The Birds of Australia with hand-coloured illustrations by Elizabeth Gould, and over 2000 books bequeathed by Lucy Gullett. The room is climate controlled to protect stock.

=== The Stack ===
The stack is the name of the City Library basement which holds none-lending items. It contains over 100,000 volumes, with content dating back to the 1800s. Items in this collection include old Newcastle Morning Heralds, NBN film reels, land title documents, maps, and limited edition books.

== Buildings ==
Newcastle Libraries has eleven branches. The Newcastle City branch (sometimes just City Library) is the main library and is located in the Newcastle War Memorial and Cultural Centre. The City branch includes the Lovett Gallery, a single-exhibition gallery which has had exhibitions on Paul Jennings, Afgan Australian Stories in Threads, Kakuda Nation Park, and a photographic exhibition on steam trains in the Hunter region.

The Local History Library is housed in the first floor of the Cultural Centre, above Newcastle City Library. It opened in 1957 with a donation from Wilfred J. Goold, the founder of the Newcastle and Hunter District Historical Society. As such, it was originally called the W. J. Goold room. Goold's collection of photos, maps, models, and old firearms had taken over 30 years to collect.

Lambton library opened in 1950, the building being converted from a council chamber built in 1887. It has unstaffed, members-only hours. Other branches are Adamstown, Beresfield, The Digital Library (Newcastle West), Hamilton, Mayfield, Stockton, Wallsend, and New Lambton which also houses the Newcastle Toy Library.

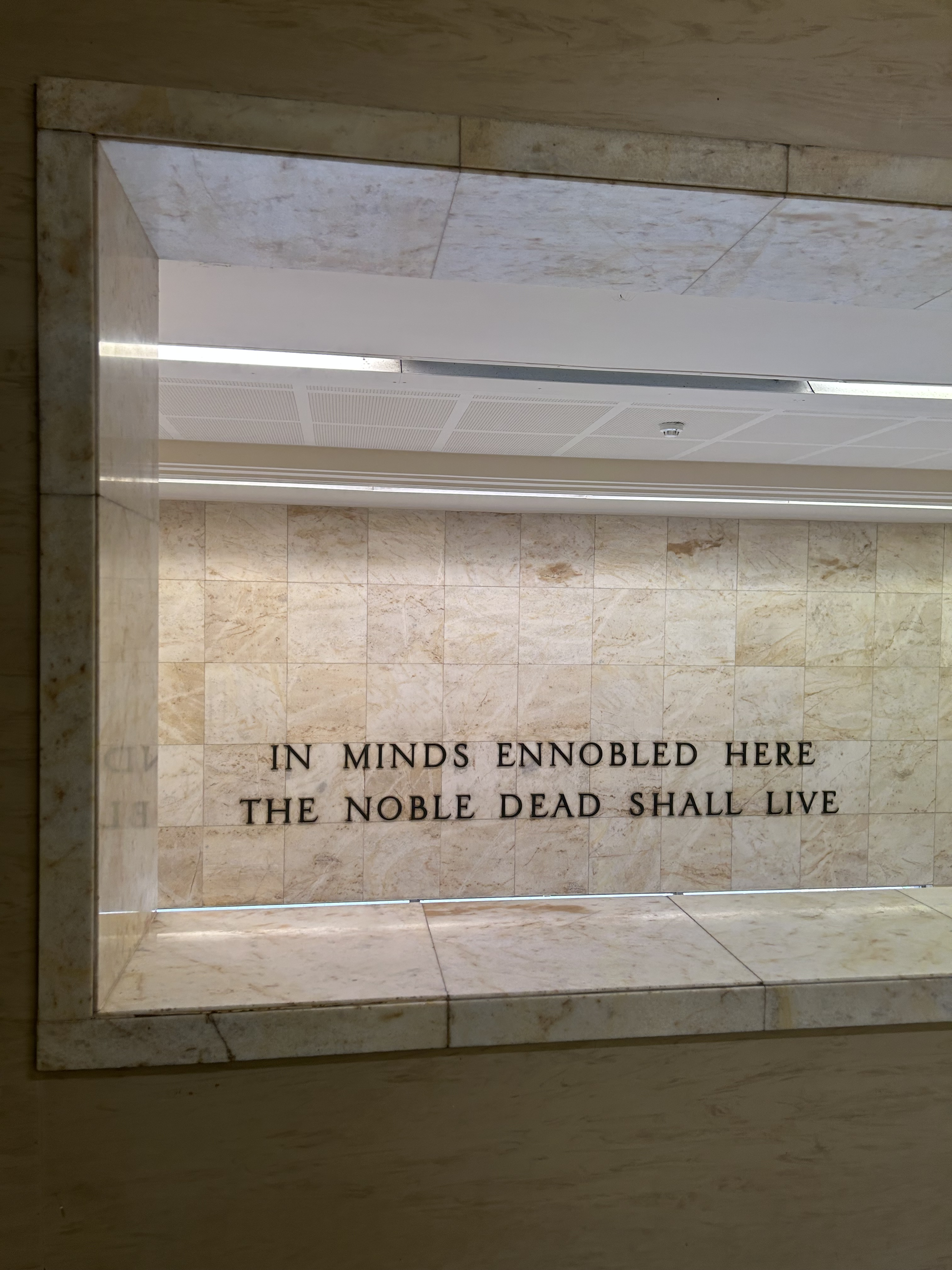
Newcastle City Library interior detail

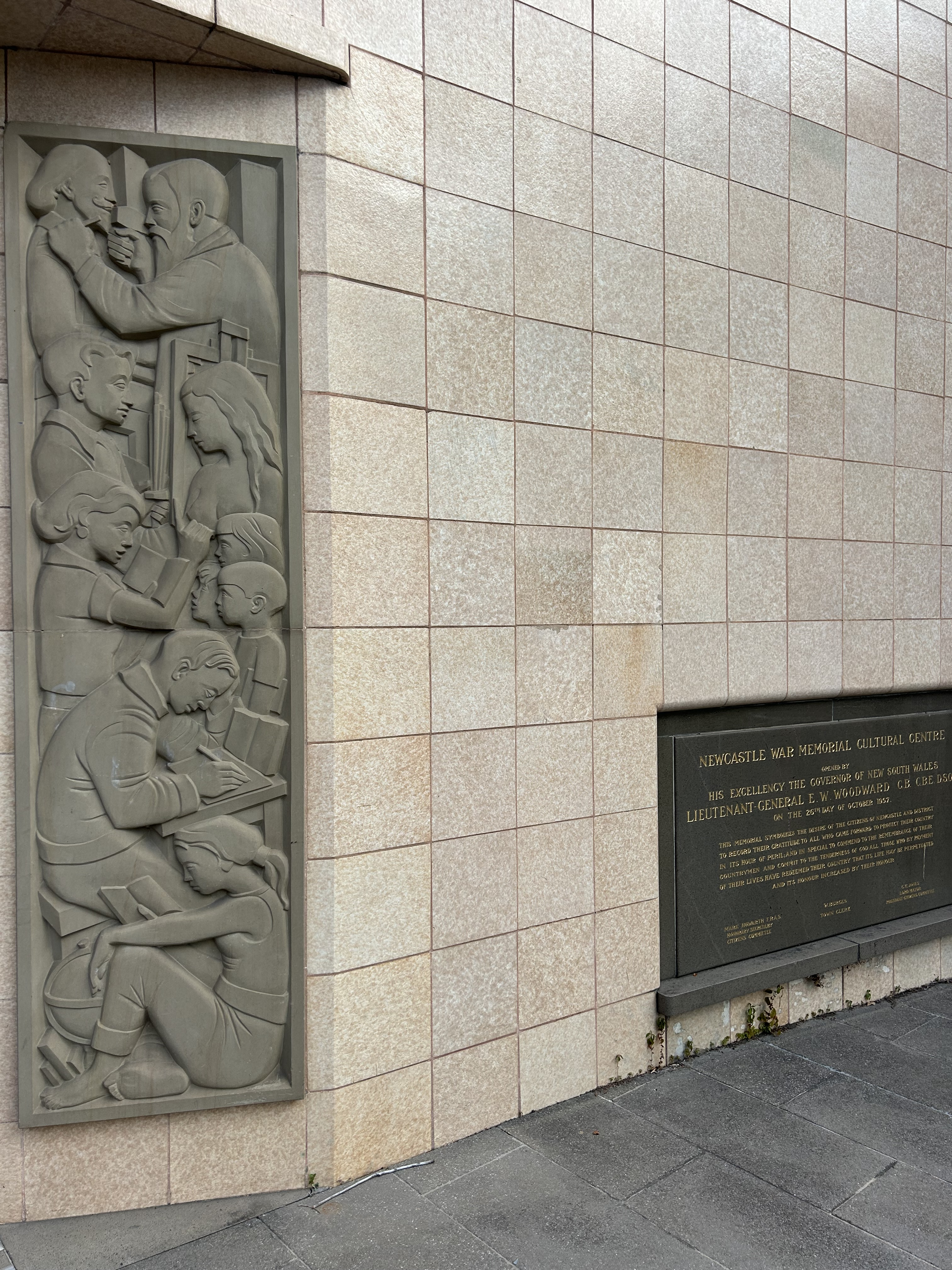
Exterior detail of Newcastle Library - 2026

== Services ==
The Newcastle Seed Library began in October 2020, and seeds are shared at Newcastle City, the Digital Library, and Wallsend. Newcastle Libraries have a home library service, podcast and media room, and 3D printing and scanning.

In 2007, Newcastle Libraries were given a $19,000 grant from the State Library of New South Wales for a community languages collection.

=== The Memory Room ===
The memory room started in 2020 and uses items from the Local History Library to help people with dementia to connect with their memories of Newcastle. The program includes an educational podcast series on dementia, art workshops run by an art therapist, a tovertafel, and lending "memory kits" which have picture books, CDs, DVDs, puzzles, games and activities. The project has worked with local schools to allow young children and people with dementia to interact and share stories.

=== DigiLab ===
The DigiLab (Digital Laboratory) was created with funding from the State Library of New South Wales, with the purpose of digitising the heritage collection. The library has a Cobra Semi-Robotic Scanner and a fully automatic digitisation robot.
