= William Herbert Ifould =

Australian librarian (1877–1969)

William Herbert Ifould OBE
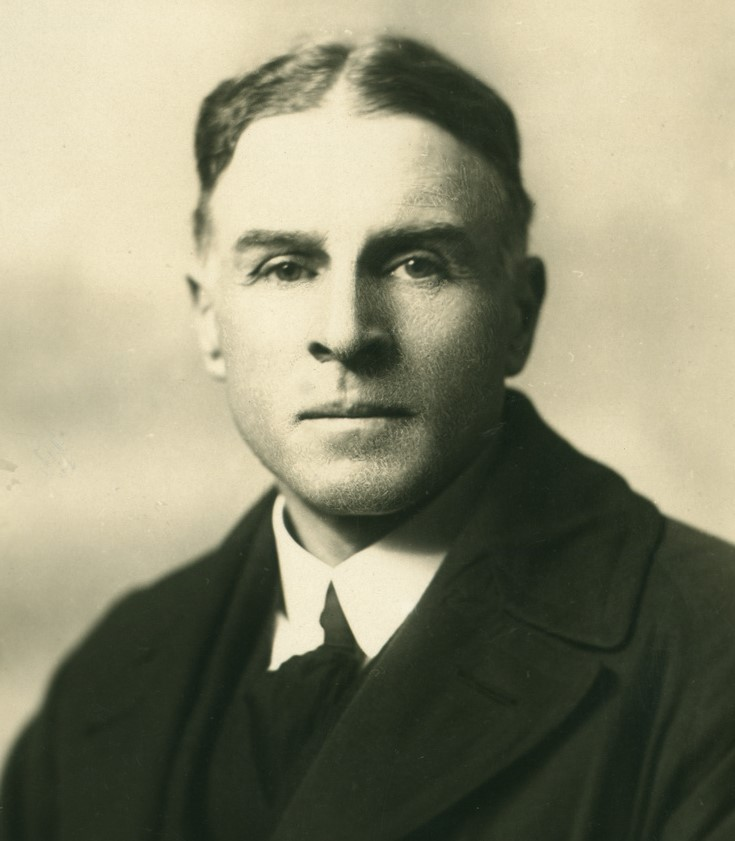
- Born: William Herbert Ifould; 28 August 1877; One Tree Hill, South Australia
- Died: 6 April 1969 (aged 91); Turramurra, New South Wales
- Occupation: Librarian

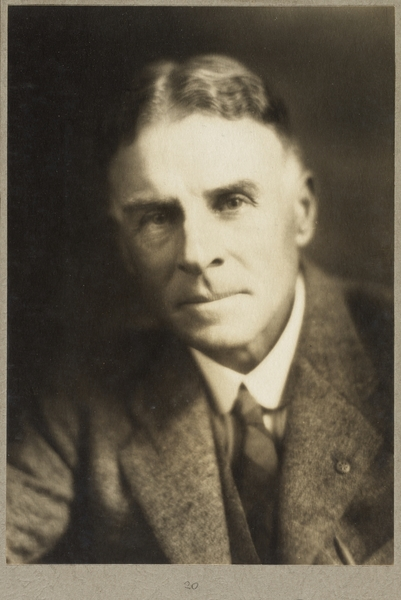
Portrait of William Ifould in 1927

William Herbert Ifould OBE (28 August 1877 – 6 April 1969) was an Australian librarian and floriculturalist who was instrumental in the development of library services in New South Wales. He was the Principal Librarian at the Public Library of New South Wales (now State Library of New South Wales) from 1912 until his retirement in 1942.

== Early life ==
William Ifould was born at One Tree Hill near Gawler, South Australia on 28 August 1877. He was the son of Edward Lomer Ifould and Marion Burn Ifould, née Cameron. He attended the Sturt Street School and Norwood State School in Adelaide before winning a scholarship to the Adelaide Collegiate School. He attended the University of Adelaide from 1902–07. He married Carrie Eugenie Foale on 5 March 1907.

== Career ==
William Ifould began his library career as a cadet at the Public Library, Museum and Art Gallery of South Australia in 1892. He held a number of different positions over twenty years at the Library and in 1905 was appointed Principal Librarian. He introduced the Dewey Decimal classification system to the Library, overseeing a twelve-year project reclassifying the collections. On his departure from Adelaide, Ifould gave a revealing interview to journalists from The Advertiser newspaper indicating he had experienced a challenging working relationship with the board of the Public Library, Museum and Art Gallery of South Australia.

Ifould had a lifelong interest in horticulture. He founded the National Rose Society of New South Wales in 1912, wrote a gardening column in the Evening News for many years, and in his spare time developed an orange orchard at Waikerie in South Australia. He was passionate about architecture and the arts, and for 39 years served as a trustee on the Board of the Art Gallery of New South Wales. Ifould was active in Rotary International, representing Australia at the International Rotary Convention in St. Louis in June 1923.

=== At the Public Library of New South Wales ===
In 1912 the Trustees of the Public Library of New South Wales recommended Ifould to the Minister and he was appointed to the position of Principal Librarian of the Public Library of New South Wales (now State Library of New South Wales) a position he held from 1912 until his retirement in 1942.

We struggle under the greatest disadvantages to do our work. Our staff is well trained and wonderfully loyal and efficient under the most trying conditions...The (Bent Street) building is utterly unsuitable and inadequate and has been so for 40 years. I have no hesitation in saying it is a disgrace to the State and to successive governments.

— W.H.Ifould, 1927

When Ifould took up his position at the Library, the new Mitchell Library building had recently opened in 1910 while the public library remained in a building on Bent Street. The poor state of the Bent Street building was noted in Library Annual Reports and debated in the local press. As the collections grew in the 1920s the conditions at the library became very crowded in both the Mitchell Wing and the Bent Street building. The Mitchell wing had been designed as the first instalment of a proposed National Library.

William Ifould cultivated the interest of Sir William Dixson as a library benefactor. Dixson, a wealthy bachelor with an interest in collecting paintings, manuscripts and an extensive Australiana collection, had a long association with the Library. In 1919 Dixson wrote to Ifould, offering his pictures collection to the NSW Government if they would provide a suitable space for them to be stored and displayed. Ifould persistently advocated the completion of the library building to the government. In 1924 Ifould provided information to a Sydney Morning Herald journalist about the value of Sir William's collection and the importance of it being accepted by the Government and housed in a new wing of the Mitchell Library building. In 1925 the Library Trustees reported that work was to begin on the new sections of the library building.

Ifould oversaw the design and construction of the next stages of the Mitchell Library, the basement section to house the Country Circulation Department in 1928, the Dixson Wing which opened in 1929 and the central portion and entrance which was completed in 1942 to house the general reference collection. The plans for the enlarged and remodelled central portion and north-east wing were prepared by the Government Architect, Cobden Parkes, with advice from Ifould and Nita Kibble the Principal Research Officer at the Library. Ifould was very involved in the design and decoration of the Library.

Ifould also oversaw the establishment of the Research Department of the General Reference Library in 1919–20 as an extension of the reading room reference service creating a library service that was accessible to the public, including people living in country areas not just to researchers and scholars. Ifould built the reputation of the Library as a leading institution in the Commonwealth for collecting records and documents relating to Australian history.

As Principal Librarian during World War I, William Ifould recognised the significance of the personal stories of Australian servicemen in World War I to the nation's historical record. In December 1918 he launched The European War Collecting Project. Ifould placed newspaper advertisements around Australia, New Zealand and in the United Kingdom seeking diaries, letters, photographs and related material from servicemen and their families to be deposited in the library collection. Approximately 500 diaries were collected by the Library through the campaign.

In 1933 he was approached by Elizabeth and Margaret MacPherson who had inherited money that their Scottish born grandfather had made. It was decided to create the Donald MacPherson Collection of Art and Literature. Purchases were made and the two sisters made further donations. The collection includes books by Giovanni Boccaccio, T. S. Eliot, Samuel Beckett and Sylvia Plath and books from historically important publishers like Kelmscott and Nonesuch. The sisters left their money to the collection when they died.

=== The New South Wales Library Act 1939 ===
There were very few free public libraries available to the people of New South Wales in the early years of the twentieth century. Different types of subscription libraries, including mechanics institutes, schools of arts and some commercial lending libraries were the only option in many communities. Several municipal libraries had begun only to close down and by the 1930s there were only two free lending libraries which served the people of Broken Hill and Sydney.

In 1934, at the instigation of the Australian Council for Educational Research the Carnegie Corporation of New York funded two commissioners, Ralph Munn and E. R. Pitt, to tour and inspect Australian libraries and to publish their report. The Munn-Pitt report examined the differences between regional library networks in Australia and the United States of America and England. The report was highly critical of the state of libraries across the country. The main recommendations from the Munn–Pitt report were the strengthening and growth of the profession of librarianship in Australia through the establishment of a library association to raise the status of trained library staff; fostering the National Library's development; combined state-municipal libraries in all capital cities except Sydney; the establishment of rate-supported municipal free libraries outside the capital cities, with continued state government subsidies; the establishment of district or regional library services covering small towns and rural areas. Not all of the Munn–Pitt recommendations were adopted, however two of these recommendations were priorities for William Ifould "to establish tax-supported municipal 'free libraries'; and to strengthen and extend librarianship by professionalising the training and registration of librarians."

In New South Wales, the Munn–Pitt report was the impetus for the establishment of a lobbying group. William Ifould addressed a public meeting held on 26 June 1935 in Chatswood where the Free library movement (FLM) was established. They enlisted a range of high-profile supporters and created a publicity campaign which included distributing transcripts of a speech by Geoffrey Cochrane Remington, a prominent Sydney solicitor, an address by Mrs Hubert Fairfax to the Country Women's Association in 1937 together with several radio interviews all promoting the introduction of public libraries. A visiting Carnegie scholar, Hartley Grattan, also published a leaflet Libraries: a necessity for democracy in 1938 supporting the free public library cause.

In response to the lobbying of the Free library movement the Minister for Education, D. H. Drummond, established the Libraries Advisory Committee which was chaired by William Ifould. The Committee prepared a report which was adopted in principle by the New South Wales Cabinet in January 1939 and led to the preparation of a Library Bill. Some of the Munn-Pitt report recommendations, including the establishment of free public libraries in every local council area, were enshrined in the Library Bill, which Ifould and Deputy Principal Librarian John Wallace Metcalfe helped to draft.

The progress of these activities was interrupted in September 1939 by the outbreak of World War II. In September 1939, Cabinet deferred the introduction of the Library Bill into Parliament. The Free Library Movement continued to lobby the government. Ifould approached members of the exclusive Australian Club winning their support along with other businessmen and newspaper editors. Ifould suggested to the Minister that the Act could be passed but the financial clauses deferred, adding that "If the Government drops the Library Bill at this stage every important metropolitan newspaper will hammer it as showing no courage or leadership. I will give the newspapers all the pabulum they require for such a campaign. I must, of course, first resign from the service."

Cabinet met on 10 October 1939 agreeing to introduce the Bill into Parliament while suspending the financial provisions. The Library Bill passed through the New South Wales Parliament on 3 November 1939 with bipartisan support. The involvement of Australia in World War II delayed the full implementation of the Library Act 1939 until Premier William McKell announced that the Act would be fully proclaimed, including the financial clauses, taking effect from 1 January 1944. Municipalities began to introduce public library services, with 32 councils adopting the Act by the middle of 1945.

Another of the Munn–Pitt report recommendations, that professional training be made available for librarians, was also implemented by Ifould when a Library School was established at the Public Library of New South Wales in 1939. It also experienced an interruption due to World War II and was suspended during 1940 but reopened in 1941.

=== Australian Institute of Librarians ===
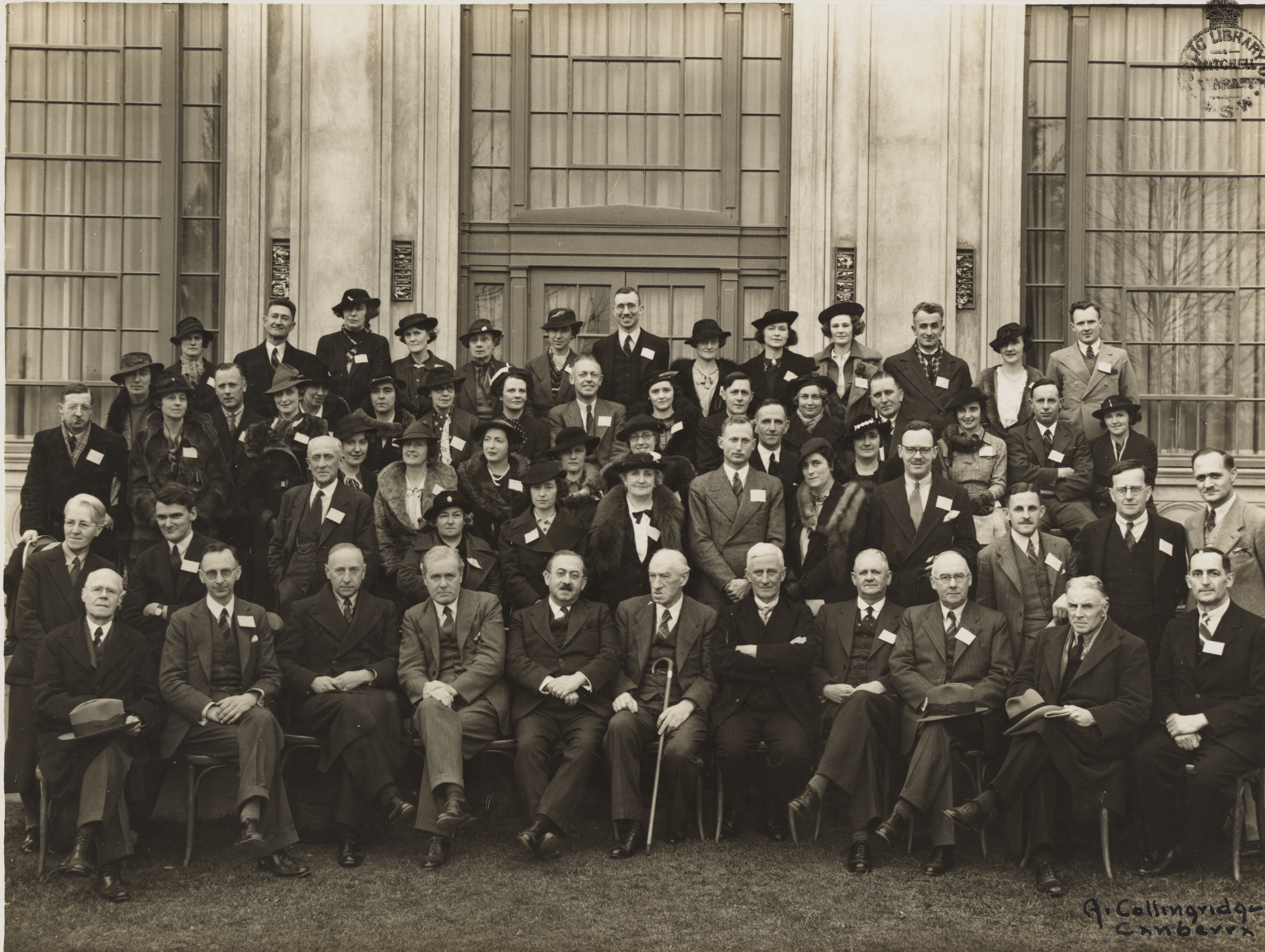
Group photograph of the delegates attending the Australian Institute of Librarians' inaugural meeting at Canberra, 20 August 1937.

During the Great Depression awareness of social and political issues had grown in Australia, including censorship and the freedom of expression. As a profession, librarians responded by establishing the Australian Institute of Librarians (AIL). Fifty-five librarians attended the inaugural meeting of the AIL in Canberra on 20 August 1937 to form the association. William Ifould was elected as the foundation president (1937–38). John Metcalfe wrote that they believed in access to "the best that has been and is being thought and said, pictured and played, written and read by our people, and throughout the world".

== Later life ==
Following his retirement from the library in February 1942, Ifould was appointed Deputy Director of the Department of War Organisation of Industry in New South Wales.

William Ifould died on 6 April 1969. He was survived by one son, Edward Lister Ifould, but his two younger sons were killed in action in World War II.

== Honours and awards ==
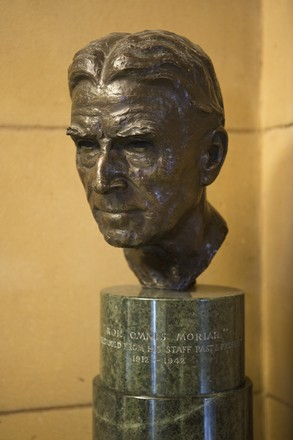
Bronze bust on marble stand by sculptor Arthur Fleischmann

- In 1921 he was made an honorary member of the Institute of Architects of New South Wales.
- In the 1928 Birthday Honours he was appointed an Officer of the Order of the British Empire (OBE).
- Ifould received a Carnegie travel grant in 1936.
- He was elected a Fellow of the Library Association (UK) in 1939.
- A bronze bust of Ifould by sculptor Arthur Fleischmann, a gift from the library staff, was placed in the vestibule of the Public Library of New South Wales.
- He was made a Foundation Fellow of the Library Association of Australia in 1963.

The Ifould Medal was established in 2013, in honour of William Ifould. The medal is awarded by the Library Council of New South Wales for distinguished achievement as a professional librarian, archivist or curator consistent with the ideals and objectives of the State Library of New South Wales.

== See also ==
- State Library of New South Wales
- List of Australian diarists of World War I
- Henry Charles Lennox Anderson
- Ralph Munn
- Jean Arnot
- Nita Kibble

Government offices
Preceded by Frank Murcott Bladen	Principal Librarian of the Public Library of New South Wales; 1912–1942	Succeeded by John Metcalfe
Preceded by James MacDonald	Director and Secretary of the National Art Gallery of New South Wales (Acting); 1936—1937	Succeeded by Will Ashton
Preceded by B. J. Waterhouse	President of the Board of Trustees of the Art Gallery of New South Wales; 1958–1960	Succeeded by Eben Gowrie Waterhouse
