= Free library movement =

Australian campaign for free public libraries

The free library movement was an Australian movement that campaigned for free public libraries. It began in 1935 and led to the legislation to promote government-funded libraries in multiple states and territories in Australia.

== Pre-movement libraries ==
Government funded libraries existed in Australia since 1833, but these libraries were usually subscription libraries in Mechanics Institutes and School of Arts which provided paid memberships and paid reading rooms – although citizens were occasionally permitted to read certain materials free of charge. In 1912 a New South Wales committee was set up to examine whether the £10,000 subsidy paid annually by the government to Schools of Arts was a good use of public funds.

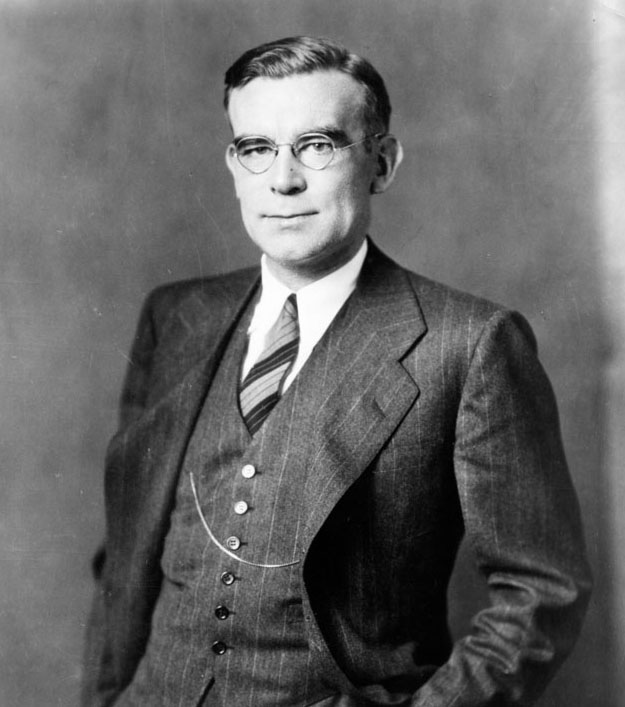
Ralph Munn, one of the authors of the report.

The first public library in Australia was the Melbourne Public Library (which later became the State Library of Victoria) in 1856. This was followed in 1869 by the Public Library of New South Wales, which later became the State Library of New South Wales. Many smaller free "libraries" were set up during this time, but they were generally only a room of reference books which were not maintained by a librarian. None of these libraries have survived into the 20th century.

=== Munn-Pitt report ===
In 1932 the Carnegie Corporation of New York funded a survey of Australian libraries carried out by American librarian Ralph Munn and the head librarian of the Public Library of Victoria, E.R. Pitt. The report, later named the Munn-Pitt report, involved over 1500 questionnaires sent to over 100 Australian libraries. When published in 1935, the report described Australian libraries as significantly behind British and American libraries in quality, calling them "cemeteries of old and forgotten books". The report heavily influenced Australians to support more funding for free libraries.

At the time, Sydney had only one reference library and one public lending library. Broken Hill was the only country town in NSW to have a free lending library.

== Formation of the movement ==
The Free Library Movement began on the 26th June, 1935 when forty individuals, led by George W. Brain (at the time an accountant but later a Member of State Parliament), met at Chatswood-Willoughby School of Arts in Chatswood, Sydney to discuss their goal "to advocate and work for the establishment of Free Libraries [and] to create and foster public opinion on the value of Free Libraries." William Herbert Ifould, Principal Librarian of the Public Library of New South Wales, spoke at the meeting.

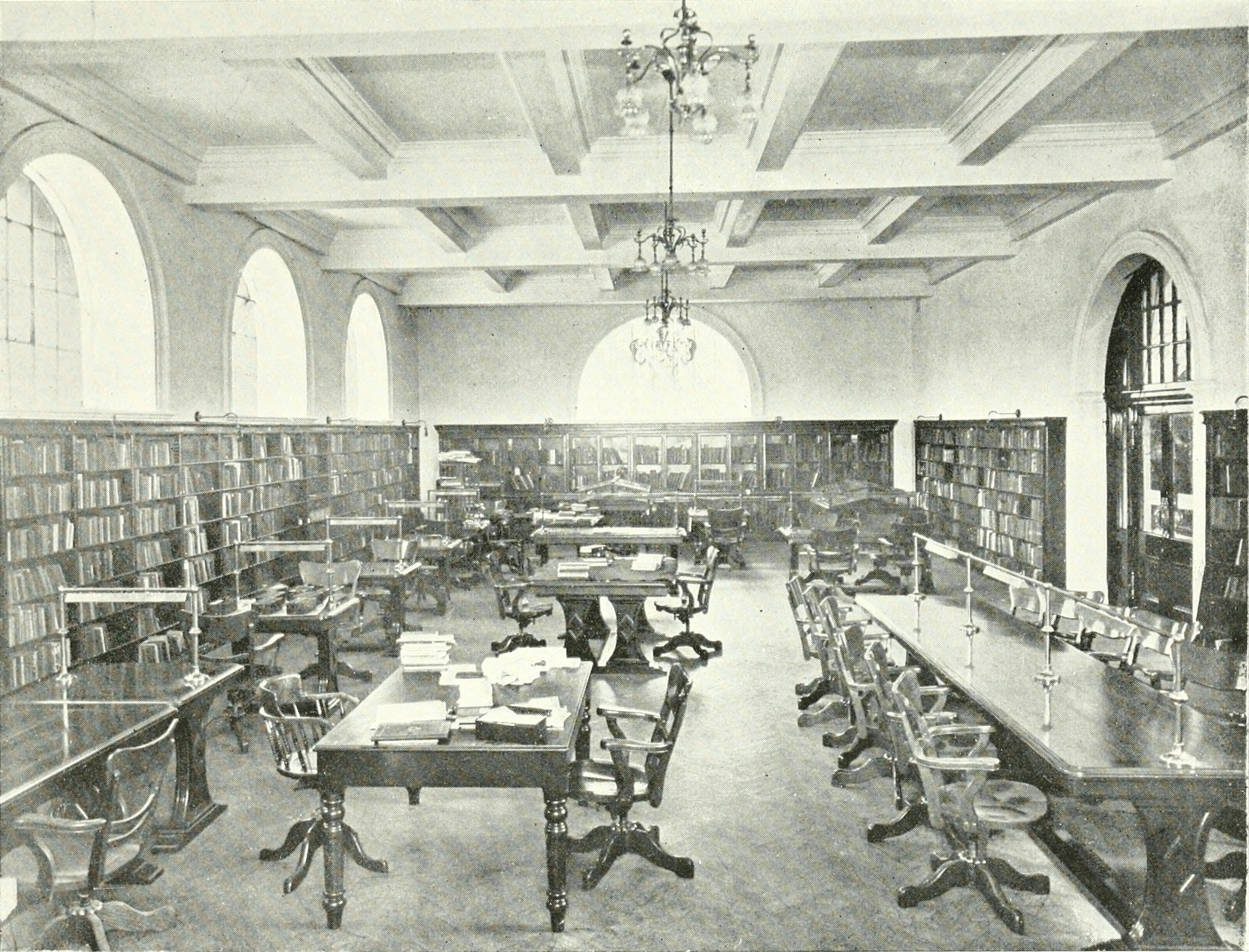
The Public Library of New South Wales

One month later in July 1935, Ifoud submitted a scheme to the cabinet of New South Wales which included plans for libraries at Newcastle, Katoomba, and Wollongong. The scheme was built on the idea that libraries in regional areas, at least to begin with, should be funded as branches of the Public Library of New South Wales. The scheme was rejected, which David Drummond, then minister for education, expressed disappointment in.

== Growth ==
In 1936, Geoffrey Remington became Chairman of the movement. By 1938, there were branches of the movement established at Ashbury, Chatswood-Willoughby, Casino, Muswellbrook, North Sydney, Lane Cove, Wagga Wagga, Orange, Bathurst, Newcastle, Maitland and Cessnock. The movement was most active in New South Wales.

John Metcalfe, deputy principal librarian of the Public Library of New South Wales, was highly involved in the movement and wrote articles, publications, and press releases supporting the movement. The movement found support from teachers and educators and was discussed in teacher associations and book clubs. A radio campaign began in January 1936, with speeches written by Remington and Metcalfe read on air by members of the movement. Metcalfe described one of the strengths of the movement being that it was "essentially a laymen's movement".

The first Victorian and Queensland branches of the Free Library Movement were established in 1937. State Librarian of Queensland, J. L. Stapleton, spoke positively on the progress of the movement in New South Wales.

Subscription libraries and School of Arts Institutes had varying reactions to the movement. In June 1939, the Dubbo Mechanics Institute unanimously supported the idea of a free library in Dubbo. Meanwhile, in July 1939 the Newcastle School of Arts said they were "not opposed to a free library in Newcastle" but were unwillingly to show support or assist in any way, believing it would be of inferior quality.

== Government response ==
In March 1937, Drummond attended the second annual general meeting of the Free Library Movement and announced his intention to create a Libraries Advisory Committee to draft a bill to establish free public libraries in New South Wales. In June 1937, the committee was established and sent out questionnaires to all municipalities (except Sydney due to an oversight) in New South Wales asking people about library services in their area. The results of the survey showed strong support for free public libraries in Australia, and was reported on by The Sun, and used to write the Libraries Advisory Committee Report, which decided on using Unimproved Capital Value (UCV) government subsidy to support Local Government Areas (LGAs) in creating free public libraries. The report boosted the support for the movement.

In 1939, the Library Act 1939 was passed by the New South Wales Parliament after being drafted by the Libraries Advisory Board. The act was expected to take effect within six months, however, when World War II began free libraries were no longer a priority for the Australian government and the act was put on hold. Despite this, public support for free libraries grew, with the movement pushing free libraries as symbols of democracy, and using the war's threat of Fascism and nazism to stress the importance of educated citizens.

In 1943, NSW premier William McKell stated that the Library Act would take effect from 1 January 1944. The act encourages LGAs to create free public libraries, assigned the state library the responsibility of supporting them to do so, and enabled state funding for free public libraries.

Between 1938 and 1953, 98 local councils in NSW had founded libraries.

== Tasmania ==
In 1937, the Tasmanian branch of the World Association for Adult Education agreed to actively support the Free Library Movement, and by March 1939, a Tasmanian branch of the Free Library Movement had been established, though by the end of the year it was focused on providing free books for soldiers in WWII.

The Tasmanian branch of the free library movement was still active in 1945. In 1942, 26 Tasmanian municipalities still had no government funded libraries. The Advocate described the response of the Tasmanian government to the movement as "such a contemptible amount as to be an absolute disgrace."

== See also ==
- Australian Library and Information Association
- Lists of libraries in Australia
