= John Metcalfe (librarian) =

Australian librarian (1901–1982)

John Wallace Metcalfe
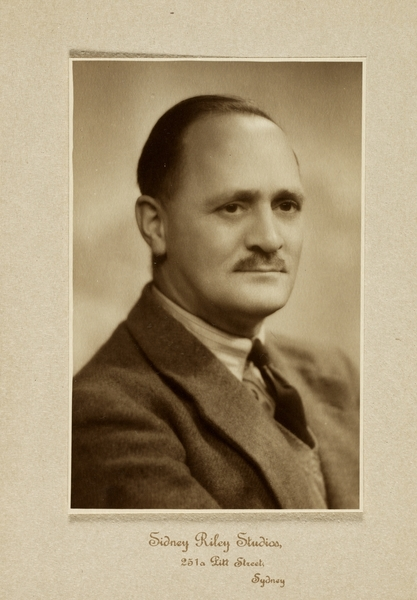
- Portrait of John Metcalfe circa 1942–1946
- Born: John Wallace Metcalfe; 16 May 1901; Blackburn, Great Britain
- Died: 7 February 1982 (aged 80); Katoomba, New South Wales
- Occupation: Librarian

John Metcalfe (16 May 1901 – 7 February 1982) was an Australian librarian, educator and author. He was the Principal Librarian at the Public Library of New South Wales (now State Library of New South Wales) from 1942 until 1958 and University Librarian at the University of New South Wales from 1959–1966. He was involved in the establishment and development of the Australian Institute of Librarians (AIL), the Free library movement and education for librarianship in Australia.

== Early life ==
John Wallace Metcalfe was born on 16 May 1901 at Blackburn, Lancashire to Henry Harwood Metcalfe, a paper-bag maker, and his wife Lilian, née Wilcock. The family migrated to Australia, via New Zealand, settling in Sydney in 1911. Metcalfe attended Marrickville Superior Public School and Fort Street Boys High School he later attended the University of Sydney. Metcalfe married Thelma Constance Vagg on 3 March 1934 at St Matthew's Church of England, Manly.

== Career ==
Metcalfe began his career working in the New South Wales State Department of Taxation in 1917 for a few weeks before taking a position as a junior library assistant in the Fisher Library at the University of Sydney.

=== The Public Library of New South Wales ===
In 1923 Metcalfe was appointed to the Public Library of New South Wales. William Ifould, the Principal Librarian, took an interest in Metcalfe's career and mentored him. Metcalfe was promoted to the newly created position of deputy principal librarian in 1932.

In November 1933 John Metcalfe presented a paper about the state of libraries in Australia to the Federal Library Conference held in Melbourne. This paper was given to Ralph Munn and Ernest Pitt who had been funded by the Carnegie Corporation of New York in 1934 to tour and inspect Australian libraries and to publish their report. In July 1934 Metcalfe was offered a travel grant of £2,000 by the Carnegie Corporation which allowed him to inspect libraries in the USA and Great Britain. The report from his trip was widely circulated.

Metcalfe contributed to the development of free public libraries in New South Wales, providing technical advice to the Free library movement (FLM), a citizens' lobby group advocating for free public libraries. As secretary for the Libraries Advisory Committee, established by the New South Wales government, Metcalfe helped to draft a bill, which became the basis for the New South Wales Library Act 1939.

In 1937 Metcalfe helped found the first local professional association of librarians, the Australian Institute of Librarians (AIL), drafting much of its constitution, and was its first honorary general secretary. He designed the AIL examinations that set the first national professional standards for librarianship in Australia. The Public Library of New South Wales provided the first formal Australian library school, commencing in 1939, Metcalfe wrote most of its textbooks.

In 1942 Metcalfe succeeded William Ifould as Principal Librarian at the Public Library of New South Wales and from 1944 he was the executive member of the Library Board of New South Wales.

In 1947 Metcalfe represented Australia at the second United Nations Educational, Scientific and Cultural Organization general conference in Mexico City, chairing a working party on public libraries.

Metcalfe opposed censorship, appearing before the Supreme Court of Queensland in a case involving 'objectionable' comics in 1955.

In October 1956, Metcalfe was seconded to the University of Sydney to review its library.

=== University of New South Wales ===
On 10 November 1958 John Metcalfe was invited to accept the position of University Librarian at the University of New South Wales. His duties would involve being responsible for the organisation and management of the University's library and the establishment and supervision of courses in library training at the University. Metcalfe was also made a member of the Professorial Board. On 2 February 1959 Metcalfe commenced as the University Librarian a role he held until May 1966. He oversaw the establishment of the first library school at an Australian university which opened in 1960 and he remained Director of the School of Librarianship until his retirement in 1968.

== Later life ==
Following his retirement, Metcalfe continued to write about subject indexing and information retrieval. John Metcalfe died on 7 February 1982 at Katoomba.

== Works ==
- Metcalfe, John (1965), Alphabetical subject indication of information, Graduate School of Library Service, Rutgers, the State University
- Metcalfe, John (1968), Book production and reproduction : notes for students of librarianship ([2nd ed.] ed.), James Bennett
- Metcalfe, John (1945), Cultural institutions in the Australian community : to hell with culture, New Century Press
- Metcalfe, John; Dewey, Melvil, 1851–1931. Decimal classification and relative index (1965), Dewey's decimal classification : seventeenth edition : an appraisal, James Bennett
- Remington, G. C. (Geoffrey Cochrane); Metcalfe, John, 1901–1982 (1945), The free library movement, 1935–1945, New Century Press
- Metcalfe, John (1957), Information indexing and subject cataloging : alphabetical, classified, coordinate, mechanical, Scarecrow Press
- Metcalfe, John (1976), Information retrieval, British & American, 1876–1976, Scarecrow Press, ISBN 978-0-8108-0875-1
- Metcalfe, John (1966), Subject arrangement and indexing of information : notes for students, James Bennett
- Metcalfe, John (1959), Subject classifying and indexing of libraries and literature, Angus and Robertson

== Honours and awards ==
- In 1936 Metcalfe was awarded a fellowship of the Library Association of the United Kingdom.
- Metcalfe was made a fellow of the Library Association of Australia in 1964.
- In 1973 he was awarded the H.C.L. Anderson award by the Library Association of Australia.
- The Metcalfe Auditorium at the State Library of New South Wales is named in his memory.
- The Metcalfe Medallion (now known as the Metcalfe Award) is awarded in his honour by the Australian Library and Information Association for outstanding student work.

== See also ==
- State Library of New South Wales
- William Herbert Ifould
