= Blue Mountains Library =

Library system in New South Wales, Australia

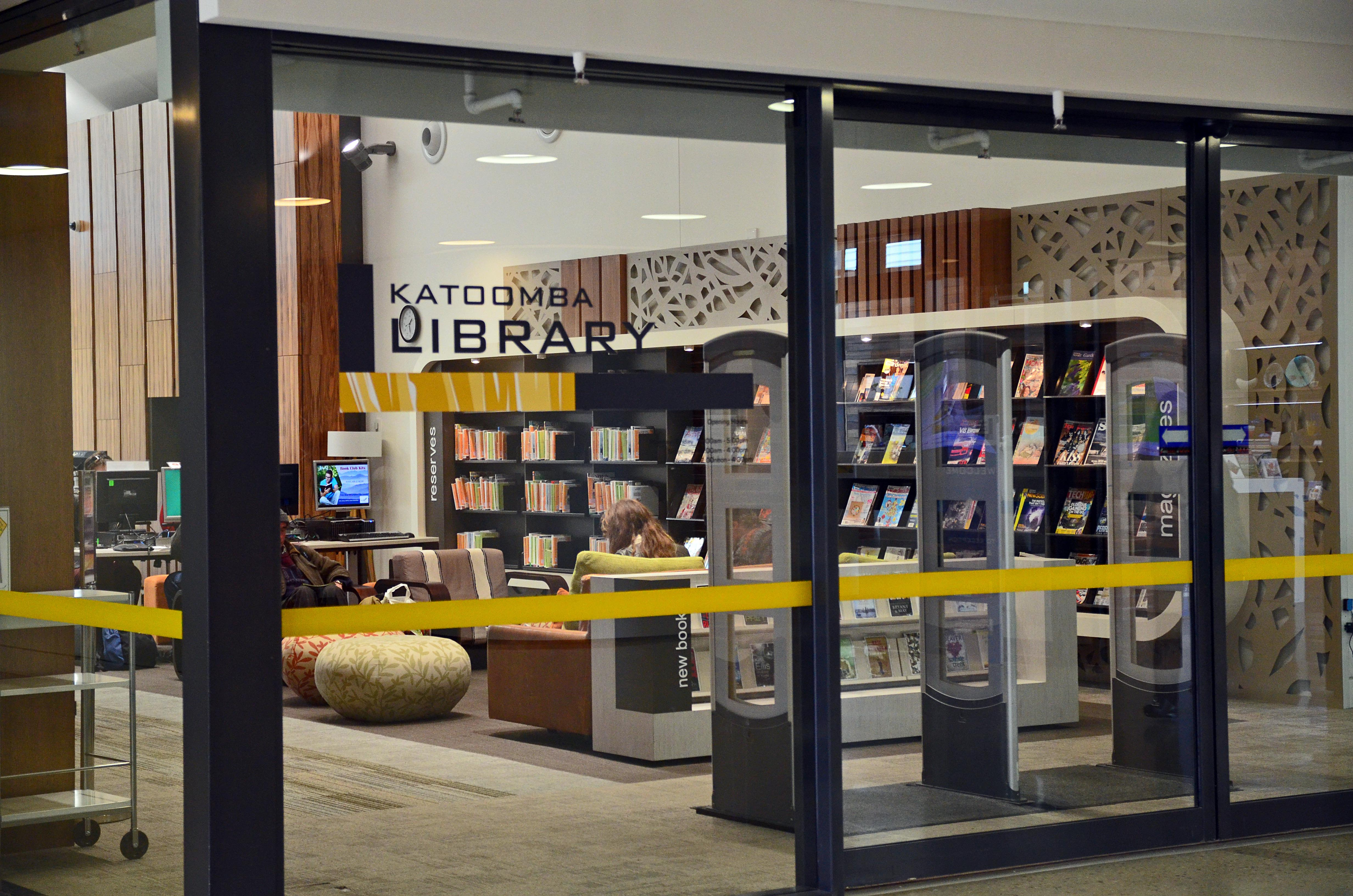
- Katoomba Library
- Location: City of Blue Mountains, Australia
- Type: Public library
- Established: 1974
- Branches: 6

Collection
- Size: 128,679

Access and use
- Circulation: 542,822
- Population served: 78,891
- Members: 28,755

Other information
- Employees: 34
- Website: library.bmcc.nsw.gov.au
- References: Mantakoun, Samantha (1 February 2026). "Public library statistics 2024-25". State Library of New South Wales.

The Blue Mountains Library is a network of six branch libraries located within the City of Blue Mountains Council administrative area in New South Wales, Australia.

== Services and Programs ==
Blue Mountains Library Services have held Dungeons and Dragons sessions, science fairs, Blue Mountains Writers Festival events, and poetry slams. Multiple branches of the library have "comfort cats" - robotic cats with soft fur and a simulated heartbeat.

In 2003, a train-based delivery service for commuters called the Book Express began. The Book Express was made of a joint partnership between the Blue Mountains City Council and CityRail, who at the time managed the Sydney rail network.

Like all other libraries in NSW, the Blue Mountains Library Service offers a home library service.

== History ==
Discussions of adopting the Library Act 1939 were around in the Blue Mountains as early as 1949, and discussions of starting a free public library in 1951. Prior to the Blue Mountains Library, the southern population of the Blue Mountains was served by Penrith City Council library service.

The Library Act 1939 itself was adopted until 1967. When the motion was passed to adopt the act by a two-to-one majority at a council meeting, there was loud applause from the gallery. In 1968, a public meeting proposed starting a library at the Blue Mountains - 113 of 120 people voted in favour.

The Blue Mountains Library Service then formally began in 1974.

In 2022, Blackheath was closed for several months after heavy rain caused damage to the roof.

== Branches ==
Blue Mountains Library Service has six branches: Blackheath Library, Blaxland Library, Katoomba Library, Lawson Library, Springwood Library, and Wentworth Falls Library.
