= Margaret MacPherson =

Margaret MacPherson or McPherson may refer to:

- Margaret Macpherson Grant (1834–1877), Scottish heiress and philanthropist
- Margaret Campbell Macpherson (1860–1931), artist born in Canada, known for her work in Scotland
- Margaret MacPherson (pharmacist) (1875–1956), Australian pharmacist and benefactress
- Margaret MacPherson (writer) (1895–1974), New Zealand journalist and author
- Margaret MacPherson (activist) (1908–2001), Scottish crofter, politician and author
- Margaret McPherson, character in The Lincoln Lawyer novel, film and TV series

== See also ==
- Karen Margaret McPherson (born 1966), Canadian politician
- Kathryn Margaret McPherson, New Zealand medical researcher
