= City of Ryde Libraries =

Public library system in Sydney, Australia

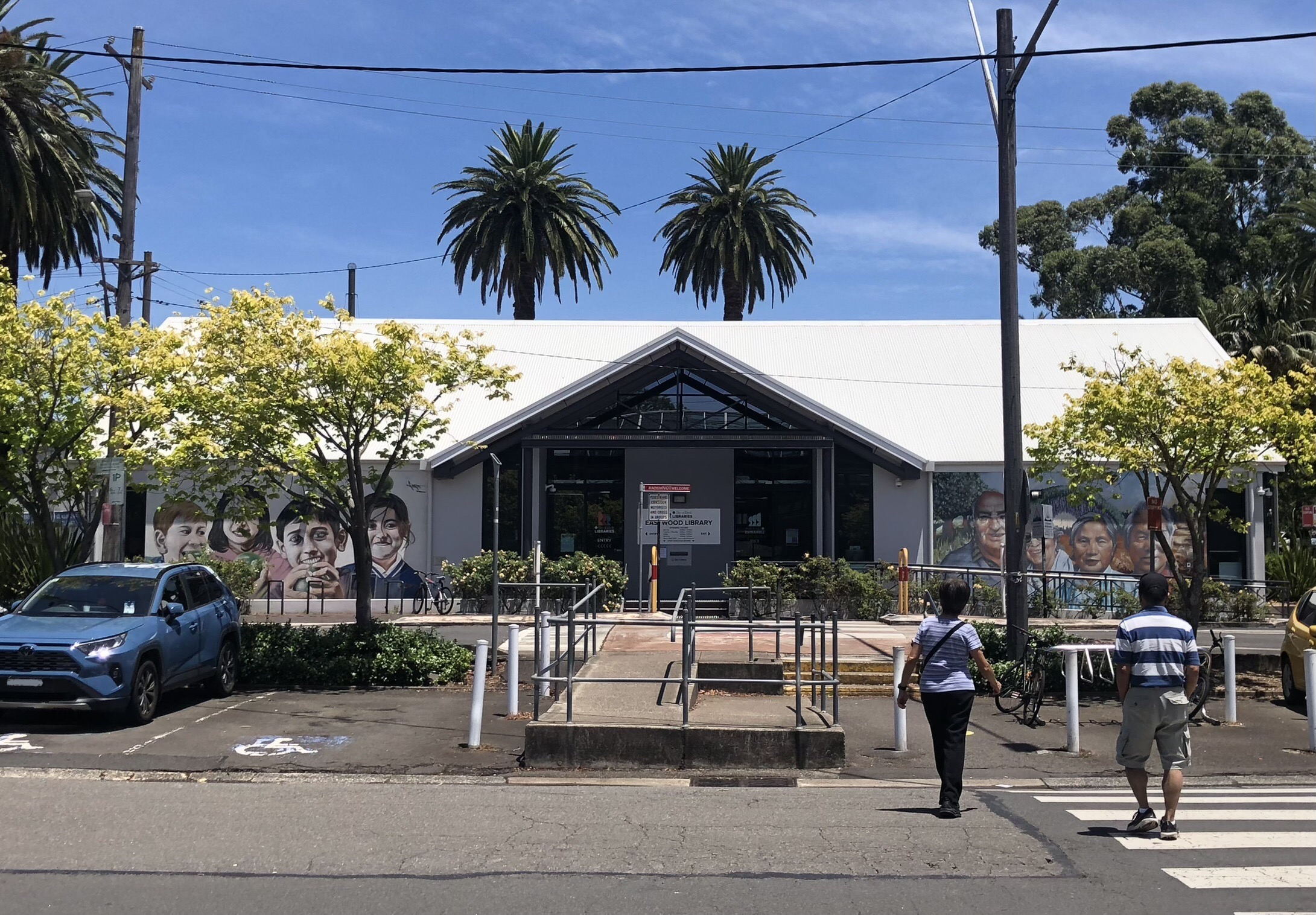
- Eastwood Library, one of five branches
- Location: City of Ryde, New South Wales, Australia
- Type: Public library system
- Branches: 5 (Eastwood, Gladesville, North Ryde, Ryde, and West Ryde)

Collection
- Size: 247,473 (2023-2024)

Access and use
- Circulation: 859,431 (2023-2024)
- Population served: 135,716 (2023-2024)
- Members: 67,189 (2023-2024)

Other information
- Employees: 51 (2023-2024)
- Public transit access: Sydney Trains, Sydney Metro

City of Ryde Libraries is the public library system for the City of Ryde in New South Wales, Australia. City of Ryde Libraries has five branches - Eastwood, Gladesville, North Ryde, Ryde, and West Ryde.

== Collection ==
City of Ryde Libraries have a large community languages collection, especially of Chinese languages, with over 15% of the community speaking one at home. Over 10% of Ryde's collection is in a language other than English.

The local studies collection began in the 1980s, and in 2024 the Ryde History Hub was introduced online, where library users can view local history resources and upload their own digitised documents and oral histories.

There is a seed library at Eastwood Library and a toy library at North Ryde Library.

== Services and programs ==
In 2023-2024 City of Ryde Libraries held 1,899 programs, with a total attendance of 42,770 people.

Ryde libraries have run a "living library" where people can borrow "living books" (people) and ask them about their life. The program was intended to "celebrate the diversity of their community in a totally unique way". City of Ryde Libraries have hosted knitting groups to support Wrap with Love. In 2000, Eastwood library held an exhibition on Korean culture, being chosen for the exhibition because of the large Korean population in the area.

A trial for 24/7 opening hours for Eastwood Library is due to begin in early 2026.

== History ==
Discussions about establishing a free public library in Ryde went back as far as the 1890s. Following the Library Act 1939, and the creation of free public libraries in other parts of Greater Sydney, plans for a free public library at Ryde began to be formalised. The Act was adopted in 1945, and Ryde Municipal Library (Note: So named because at the time, the City of Ryde was the Municipality of Ryde.) was opened in 1946.

By 1949, the library had over 9000 books. In the 1950s, more branches of Ryde Municipal Library were opened - Eastwood Library in 1959 after the closure of the Eastwood School of Arts, upon which the council took over the library, Gladesville in 1957 after Ryde partnered with Hunters Hill council, West Ryde Library in 1975, and North Ryde Library in 1982 after the demolition of the School of Arts building out of which a volunteer-run library had run for forty years prior - the new library and community space building was built on the old site of the School of Arts, and during the building the library ran out of a classroom at North Ryde Public School. In the 1990s, North Ryde Library also functioned as a synagogue.

Eastwood moved to its current location in 1991, a new West Ryde Library building opened in 2005, and in 2011 Ryde Library moved from Civic Hall to Top Ryde shopping centre, after the old library had suffered long-term water damage and closures due to flooding.

In 2001, the City of Ryde Libraries launched the online Ryde Library and Information Service Catalogue, which allowed members to check the catalogue, see local history items, and check their reservations and loans online.

In 2012, a man suffered a cardiac episode in West Ryde Library, and was given CPR by a librarian and student. In response to the incident, the council installed defibrillators at all Ryde Libraries branches.

In 2014, the front wall of Eastwood Library was painted with a mural by artist Heesco of children with Granny Smith apples (which were first grown in Eastwood) during the Moon Festival.

In 2006, Hunters Hill Council were considering opening their own council library, claiming it would be cheaper than continuing to share Gladesville Library with Ryde. This threatened the existence of the Gladesville Library which the City of Ryde council said would struggle to be funded without support from Hunters Hill. After community outrage and protests, Ryde reduced the amount of Hunters Hill had to pay, and the partnership continued until 2019 when the Hunters Hill council chose not to renew the partnership with Ryde, instead joining with Lane Cove Libraries.

City of Ryde Libraries branches had reduced opening hours during the COVID-19 pandemic, like many library systems in Sydney.
