= Inner West Libraries =

Library system in NSW, Australia

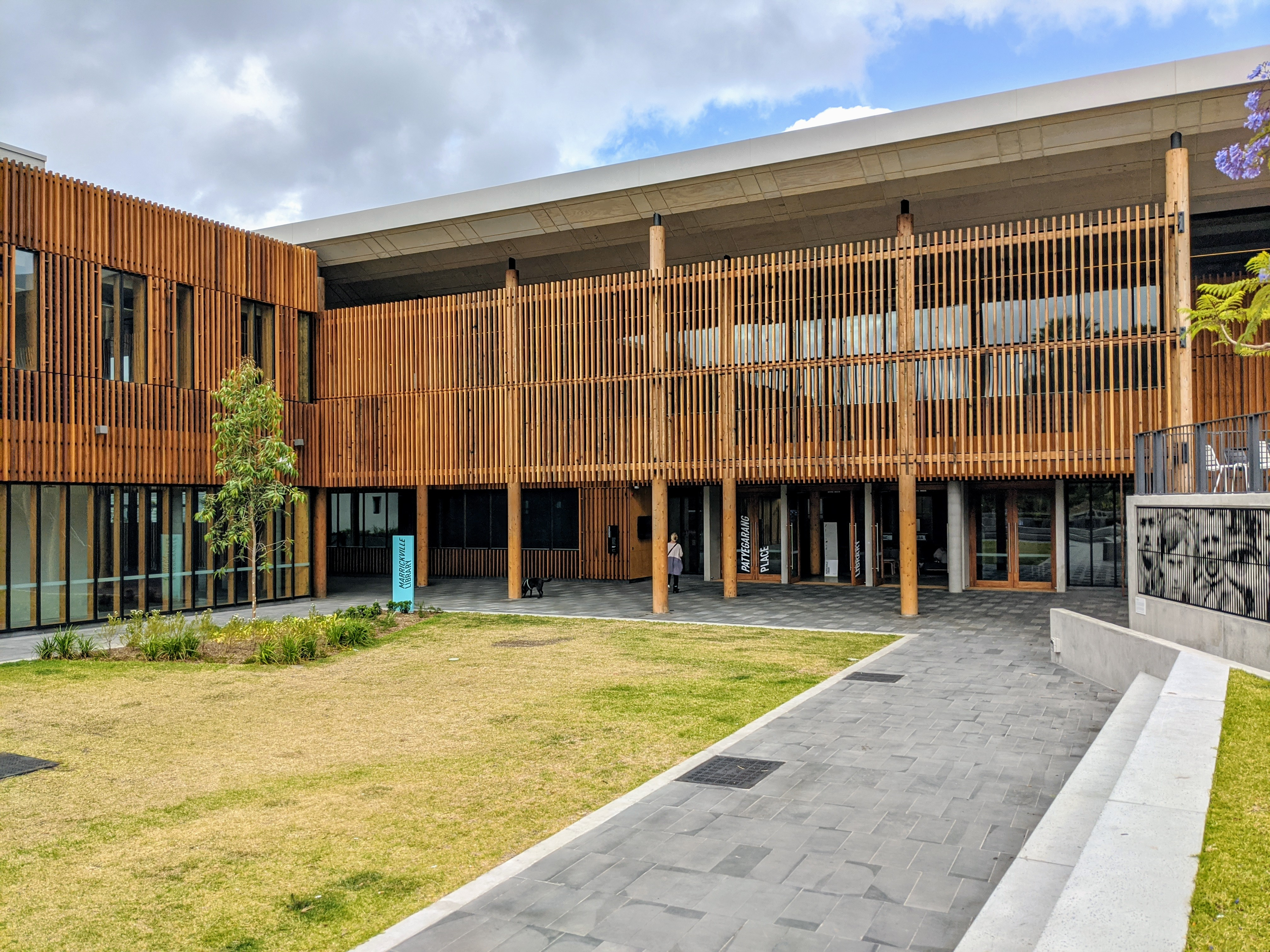
- Marrickville Library exterior in 2019
- Location: Inner West, Greater Sydney, Australia
- Type: Public library
- Established: 2016 (following council merger)
- Branches: 8

Collection
- Items collected: 285,026 (255,276 lending items)

Access and use
- Circulation: 1,643,458
- Population served: 190,939
- Members: 83,941

Other information
- Employees: 66
- Website: innerwest.nsw.gov.au/explore/libraries
- References: Mantakoun, Samantha (2026-02-01). "Public Library Statistics 2024-25: Public Library Services in New South Wales". State Library of New South Wales.

Inner West Libraries is the public library system in the Inner West Council area in New South Wales, Australia. It began in 2016 with the amalgamation of Ashfield, Leichhardt and Marrickville councils and their respective library systems.

== Services and Programs ==
Inner West Libraries have a collection of 285,026 items, 255,276 of which are lending items. In 2024–2025, there were 1,302,835 visits to Inner West Libraries. Like all other public libraries in New South Wales, Inner West Libraries offer community language collections and a home library service.

In the 2024-25 year, Inner West Libraries held 2,223 programs with 67,613 attendees. Inner West Library programs include a chess club, English classes, and family history workshops.

Leichhardt Library Oral History Project is a project that has collected 130 oral histories with transcripts, which have been collected since 1997. Ashfield Library has held book sales of weeded books. Since 2024, multiple Inner West Libraries have made free tampons and period products available.

== History ==
=== Pre Inner West Council ===
Inner West Council Libraries were formed in 2016 when the councils of Marrickville, Ashfield, and Leichhardt merged into Inner West Council. Prior to the merge, these three councils all had their own public library systems.

Marrickville Library, Dulwich Hill Library, Stanmore Library, and St. Peters Library were all part of Marrickville Council Libraries, which began in 1947 and ended with 117,960 items in its collection and 28,589 library members. Ashfield Library and Haberfield Library were originally owned by the Municipality of Ashfield, which began in 1964 and finished with 100,828 items in its collection and 24,815 registered members. Leichhardt Library and Balmain Library were part of the Leichhardt Council library system, which began in 1971 and finished with a collection size of 122,694 items and 44,303 registered members.

=== Post-amalgamation ===
Like many libraries in Sydney, Inner West Libraries were closed during the COVID-19 Pandemic. In particular, Stanmore Library and Emanuel Tsardoulias Community Library were closed for an extended time as they were too small to allow for social distancing.

Haberfield Centre and Library had AU$4.3million upgrade in 2021, with the entrance to the Haberfield School of Arts being reinstated.

== Branches ==
Inner West Council Libraries has eight branches: Ashfield Library, Balmain Library, Emanuel Tsardoulias Community Library (located at Dulwich Hill and named after Marrickville counsellor Emanuel Tsardoulias, who died of cancer in 2014), Haberfield Centre and Library, Leichhardt Library, Marrickville Library, Stanmore Library and the St Peters/Sydenham Library.

Marrickville Library was completed in 2019. The building was built on the site of the old and abandoned Marrickville hospital, with parts of the building being resused for the library. It was designed by BVN Architects. Marrickville Library was a finalist for International Public Library of the Year Award 2021 and won the NSW National Trust's National Trust Heritage Awards for Adaptive Re-use.
