= Patricia Gallaher =

Australian librarian

Patricia Evelyn Gallaher
- Born: 18 May 1937; Sheffield, South Yorkshire, England
- Died: 11 December 2014 (aged 77); South Perth, Western Australia, Australia
- Occupations: Librarian, Councilor
- Years active: 1950s–2014
- Employer(s): Geraldton Library, Geraldton City Council
- Organization(s): Library Board of Western Australia, Australian Library and Information Association
- Known for: Establishing the Randolph Stow Young Writers Award
- Awards: 2003 Medal of the Order of Australia (OAM); * 2011 Fellow of the Library Board of Western Australia

Patricia Evelyn Gallaher OAM (18 May 1937 – 11 December 2014) was an Australian librarian who established the Randolph Stow Young Writers award and promoted the arts in regional parts of Western Australia.

== Early life ==
Gallaher was born in England in 1937.

== Career ==
Gallaher began her working life as a laboratory technician in Sheffield. She emigrated to Australia and worked at the Defence Standards Laboratories in Alexandria, Sydney.

Her first library job was at Mosman Public Library in Sydney. Moving a few years later to Western Australia, Gallaher worked in public libraries in regional areas for almost 30 years. She held positions in Paraburdoo and Karratha, and then for 20 years as the regional librarian for the City of Geraldton (1981-2001). While at Geraldton Library, Gallaher introduced many new services and developments, including a service to house-bound residents, the internet, and an automated library management system. She also oversaw extensions to the Library and established the local studies collection.

Recognizing a need to foster young writers, Gallaher initiated the Randolph Stow Young Writers Award in 1989 to encourage school students in the Geraldton region of Western Australia to write. Gallaher served on many committees promoting regional arts, including the Geraldton Arts Council and as a board member of Country Arts WA. In 1987 Gallaher formed the Mid West regional chapter of the Australian Library and Information Association (ALIA).

Gallaher joined the Library Board of Western Australia in 2002 as the representative for the Western Australian Local Government Association and served a four-year term to 2006. She was named as a Fellow of the Library Board in 2011, in recognition for her commitment to libraries and the arts in regional Western Australia. She was interviewed on 28 October 2013 as part of the Library Board of Western Australia 60th anniversary project.

Gallaher remained involved with the library profession in her retirement, helping to establish the Retirees section of the Australian Library and Information Association.

== Political life ==
Following her retirement from the Geraldton Library, Gallaher was elected to the Geraldton City Council, serving on the municipal council from 2001 to 2003.

== Awards ==
- 2003 Medal of the Order of Australia (OAM) for service to the arts and to the community, particularly as a regional librarian.
- 2011 Fellow of the Library Board of Western Australia

== Personal life ==
Gallaher died in Perth, Western Australia on 11 December 2014.
