= Library Council of New South Wales =

Australian state government agency

The Library Council of New South Wales is the governing body of the State Library of New South Wales, as described in the Library Act 1939. The Library Council also has specific responsibilities to monitor the operation of public libraries in New South Wales which includes inspections and the payment of financial subsidies.

== Legislation ==
The Library Act lists three current objectives for Library Council:

"The objects of the Council are:
(a) to promote, provide and maintain library services and information services for the people of New South Wales through the State Library and through co-operation with local libraries and other libraries and information agencies,
(b) to advise the Minister, local authorities and, when the Minister so approves, other bodies, on matters of policy and administration relating to library services and information services that are or may be provided through local libraries or other libraries, and
(c) to advise the Minister on the provision of assistance to local libraries or other libraries."

== History ==
=== Board of trustees ===
When the Library Act 1969 amendment came into effect on 1 July 1969, The Board of Trustees who had overseen the operation of the two parts of the State Library of New South Wales, the Public Library and the Mitchell Library, was replaced by a newly established Library Council.

=== Library Board of New South Wales ===
Prior to March 1975, two organisations guided the provision of public library services for the people of New South Wales. The Library Council of New South Wales and the Library Board of New South Wales. The Library Board of New South Wales was established to administer subsidies under the Library Act 1939, to assist local municipal councils in establishing and operating public libraries. The Board oversaw inspections of the public libraries operated by local government and advice provided on the establishment of public library facilities in communities and co-operation between local government authorities to create regional library services.

=== Amalgamation of the Board and the Council ===
In 1974, a joint recommendation was put forward by the Library Board of New South Wales and the Library Council "for a merger which would give the Library Council responsibility for running the Public Library of New South Wales (now known as the State Library of New South Wales), administering grants to the New South Wales library service and advising the minister."

== Membership ==
The Council is a committee made up of members of the public. The nine members of the Council are nominated by the Minister for the Arts and appointed to a three-year term by the Governor of New South Wales. The Library Act specifies that the Council must include at least one person who has knowledge of, or experience in, education, and at least one person who has knowledge of, or experience in, local government. The NSW State Librarian is the Secretary of the Library Council.

=== President of Library Council ===
Many prominent community members have served on Library Council and the position of president has been held by:

Dates	Name
1890–1906	J. Norton
1906–1912	Professor Mungo William MacCallum
1912–1924	J.A. Dowling
1924–1926	W. Wood
1927–1937	Sir Daniel Levy
1937–1963	Rt. Hon. H. V. Evatt
1963–1967	Hon. Sir John Ferguson KT, OBE
1968–1973	Professor A.J. Dunston
1974–1979	Hon. Mr Justice Rae Else-Mitchell CMG QC
1979–1983	Dulcie Stretton CBE
1983–1986	R. Hall
1986–1989	Dr A.M. Hertzberg AO
1990–1996	J. Bain AM
1997–2005	Hon. Justice M. Pearlman AO
2005–2006	Belinda Hutchinson AM
2007–2014	Robert Thomas AM
2015–2016	Andrew Tink AM
2016–present	George Souris AM
