= Margaret MacPherson (pharmacist) =

Australian pharmacist and benefactor

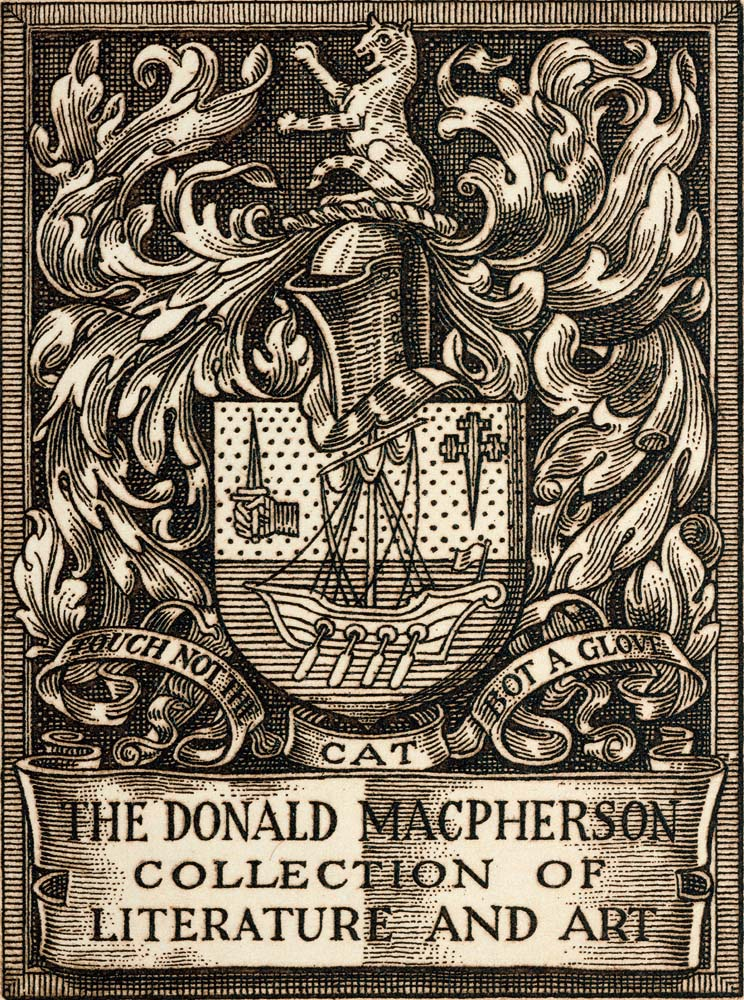
- Born: 20 February 1875; Gundagai
- Died: 27 October 1956 (aged 81); Paddington, Sydney
- Occupation: Pharmacist
- Known for: donating to the State Library of New South Wales

Margaret MacPherson (20 February 1875 – 27 October 1956) was an Australian pharmacist and benefactor. She and her sister established the Donald MacPherson Collection of Art and Literature at the State Library of New South Wales.

== Life ==
MacPherson was born in 1875 in Gundagai. Her father, Alexander, had bought a station at Umbango and married Delicia Anne Viner. Margaret had two brothers and she had an elder and younger sister. In 1904 she successfully took the exams of the Board of Pharmacy and she was licensed to deal in medicines and poisons. She had worked for three years before this with Josiah Parker who ran a Sydney-based pharmacy and after she qualified she ran a branch of Josiah Parker's shops.

In 1908, she began eight years of work with the Royal Hospital for Women which was then in Paddington as the dispenser. She was given good pay rises and in 1911 she joined the Pharmaceutical Society of New South Wales.

In 1917, her father Alexander died and in 1918 so did her brother, Allister. The family decided to sell the substantial estate at Umbango.

In 1933, Elizabeth and Margaret MacPherson went to see Sydney's Principal Librarian William Herbert Ifould. They explained that they had inherited money that their Scottish born grandfather had made. It was decided to create the Donald MacPherson Collection of Art and Literature. Purchases were made and the two sisters made further donations. The collection included books by Giovanni Boccaccio, T. S. Eliot, Samuel Beckett and Sylvia Plath and books from historically important publishers like Kelmscott and Nonesuch.

MacPherson died in the Sydney suburb of Paddington in 1956. The sisters had made wills in 1937 and they both left substantial sums of money to the collection when they died. The family's papers are in the NSW library.
