= Home library service =

Book delivery by libraries

- HLS
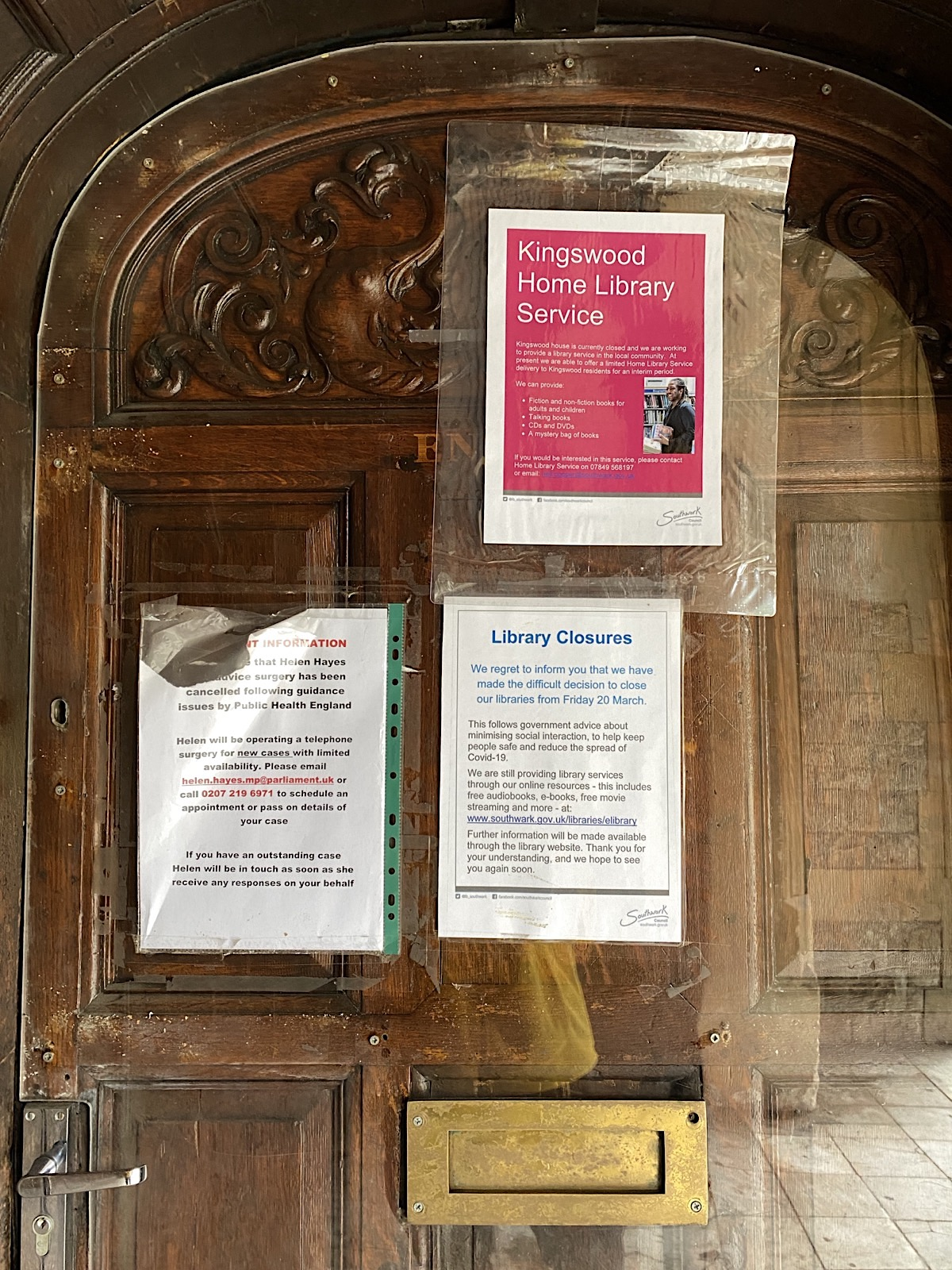
- Advertisement for a HLS for residents of Kingswood Estate, London
- Location: Australia and the United Kingdom
- Type: Public library service

Access and use
- Access requirements: Members of public unable to otherwise access local library facilities

A home library service (HLS) is a delivery service offered by some libraries (especially in Australia and the United Kingdom) for people who are unable to visit a library because of sickness, disability, or geography.

Home Library Services deliver library items to library user's homes, as well as retirement homes and nursing homes, where the staff will work with librarians to deliver services. Historically, some home library services are managed by external organisations such as the Red Cross rather than the library itself. Some HLS services use couriers, while others will have librarians or volunteers connect with users directly. Direct connection means library staff can connect library users with further community activities and council resources. Proponents of HLS say that it can help people feel more involved with their community especially when HLS users form relationships with the volunteers or librarians.

Users of a home library service may request specific titles, or list preferences like genre and format, and have librarians select items for them. Most users of HLS are elderly and may need large print books.

While HLS is usually a public library service, it has been offered by academic libraries.

== By country ==
=== Australia ===
Despite not being a legal requirement of public libraries, HLS is offered by almost all major public libraries in Australia in 2024. It is strongly promoted by the Australia Library and Information Association (ALIA), who stated in 2000 "The home library service should be a mainstream, integral, part of a public library service, with priority equal to other services of the library" and provide guidelines for the service.

Australian public libraries are not allowed to charge for HLS services because of section 10 of the Library Act 1939 which states:

No charge is to be made for the delivery to a member of the library of any book or information that the member is entitled to borrow free of charge if the member for reasons of ill-health or disability cannot reasonably be expected to attend the library in person.

=== United Kingdom ===
In the UK, home library services are often delivered by volunteers rather than library staff. Some libraries offer HLS to people living in rural areas who do not have local libraries.

=== Other countries ===
Home library services also exist in Argentina, Thailand, the Netherlands, Finland, and Canada. In the US, items are sometimes sent through the postal service rather than delivered directly.

== See also ==
- Meals on wheels
