= Broken Hill City Library =

Australian public library

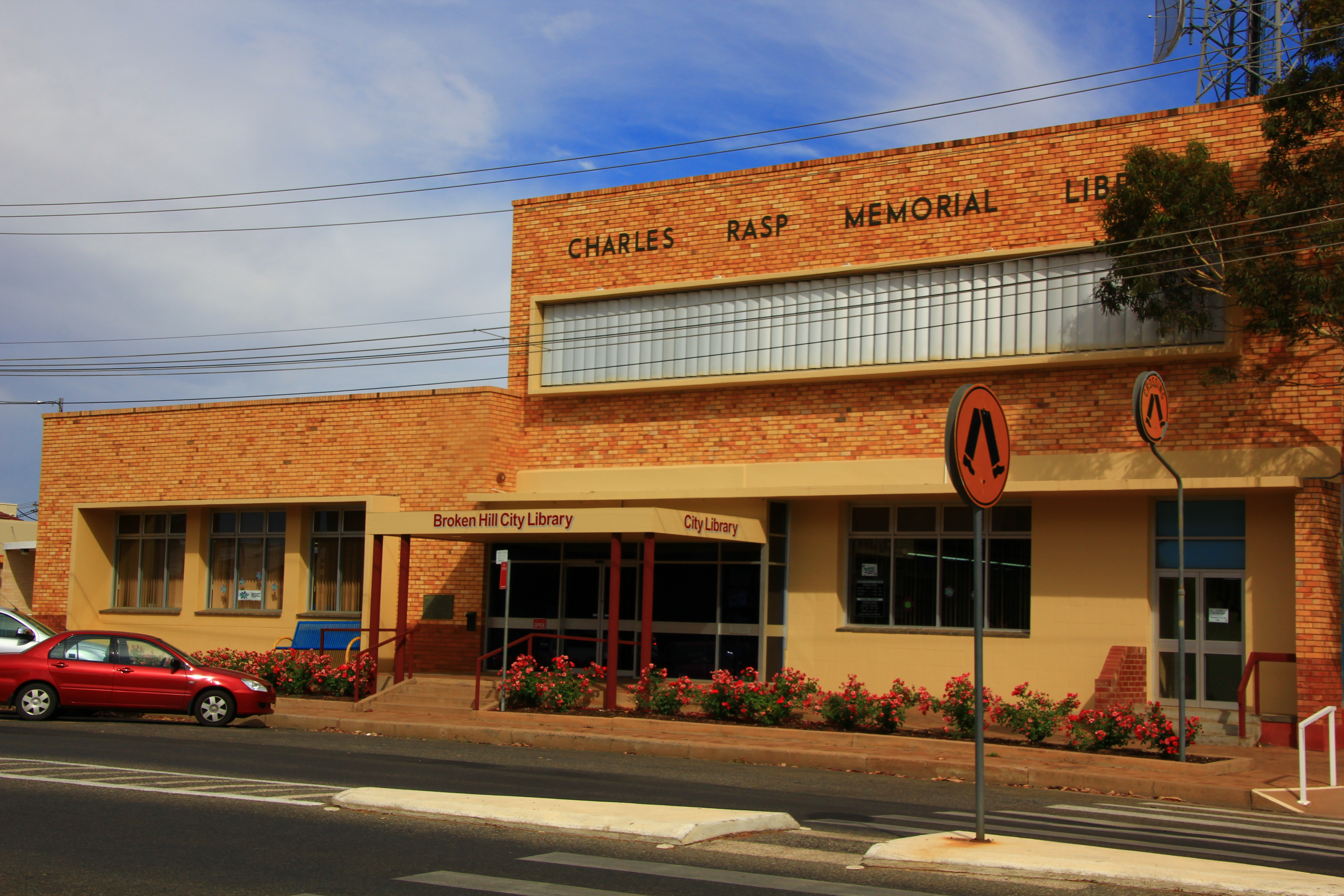
Broken Hill City Library

The Broken Hill City Library is a remote public library in NSW, located in the far western region of New South Wales.

The library provides services to residents living in Broken Hill providing access to books, computers and programs. The surrounding region of the Far West region including Central Darling Shire and the unincorporated area, an area that extends from the South Australian border to the Queensland border out past Bourke and down to the Victorian border, is serviced through the Outback Letterbox Library which operates from the Broken Hill City Library. The Outback Letterbox Library service is funded through the Library Council of NSW and operates in partnership with the State Library of NSW and Broken Hill City Council.

The services that the library offers include physical and online services. There are a computers available for the public to use, as well as WIFI connectivity within the library. Early literacy programs to help promote an early interest in reading and learning. School Holiday Activities for school aged children as well as Adult programs. The Outback Archives, houses historic material relating to Broken Hill and surrounding regions. Outreach services include the Home Library Service delivering resources to those unable to get to the library due to illness.

== History ==
The first library in Broken Hill was opened as part of the Mechanics Institute that was opened in October 1891. The bylaws for the Free Public Library of the Municipal District of Broken Hill appeared in the New South Wales Government Gazette on 24 December 1891.

Broken Hill City Library is one of the oldest free public libraries in New South Wales, Australia. Opened in 1891. A Children’s library was introduced in 1914 believed to be the first Children's free lending library in Australia.

The current building that houses the Broken Hill City Library was opened 1964 and was named the Charles Rasp Memorial Library.

== Library managers ==
Over the years the name of the position has gone through a few changes. Sometimes called Chief Librarians, Librarian, Library Manager or Library Co-Ordinator. Each manager has contributed to the collection and e services that the library has for the community.

- Robert S Ross – 3 September 1906 to 25 March 1908
- Thomas Gibson – 9 April 1908 to 3 April 1909
- William O'Connell – 6 April 1909 to 10 September 1926
- Maurice Bannister – 1926 until he was suspended by council on 16 April 1930
- John Picken – 26 June 1930 to 24 October 1930
- Moses Atherton – 26 June 1931 to his retirement on 21 September 1951
- Allan Coulls – 28 September 1951 to his retirement on 7 August 1971
- John Gough – 1971 to his retirement in April 1982
- John Liebich – 1982 to 1 November 1986
- Freda Van Zetten – 8 December 1986 to 1987
- Jim Leary – 1987 to 1994
- Marvis Sofield – 1994 to retirement on 13 April 2012
- Denise Orr – April 2012 to March 2013 (Acting)
- Cheryl Smith – 4 March 2013 - 2016
- Tracy Fraser - May 2016 - March 2023
- Jessica Picken - March 2023 - 2024

== Services ==
=== Outback Letterbox Service ===
The Outback Letterbox Library was started in March 1977 to provide free library material to people who live in remote areas of Far Western New South Wales. The service reaches north up to the Queensland border, west to the South Australian border, south to the Victorian border and east to over areas as far as Bourke, New South Wales. The Outback Letterbox Library is funded through the Library Council of NSW and operates in partnership with the State Library of NSW and Broken Hill City Council.

=== Books On Wheels ===
The Books On Wheels service delivers library material to those who can not get to the library. This service delivers books to the elderly and frail directly to their residence.

=== Outback Archives ===
The Outback Archives, houses historic material relating to Broken Hill and surrounding regions. The Outback Archive relies on the generosity and commitment of donations to grow its collections for future generations. It is recommended that appointments be made in advance to visit the Archive.
