= Ralph Munn =

American librarian (1894–1975)

Ralph W. Munn
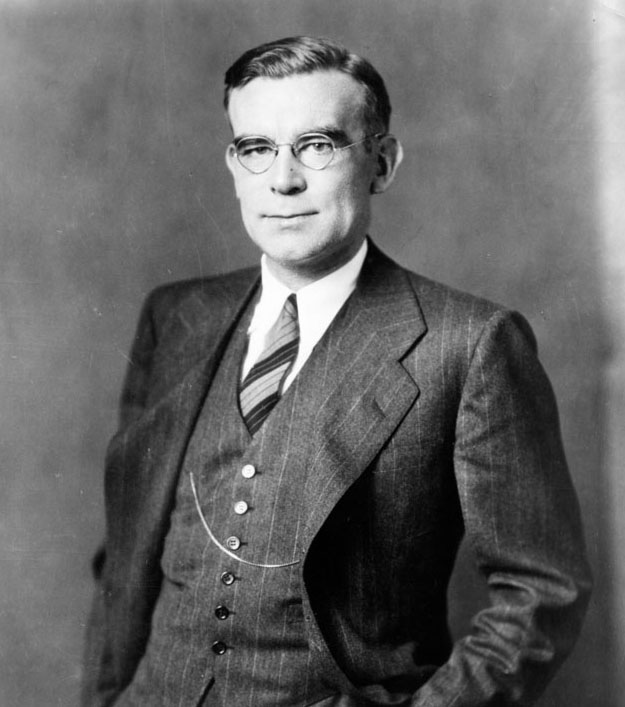
- Munn c. 1940

President of the American Library Association
- In office 1939–1940
- Preceded by: Milton James Ferguson
- Succeeded by: Essae Martha Culver

Personal details
- Born: September 19, 1894 Aurora, Illinois, US
- Died: January 2, 1975 (aged 80) Pittsburgh, Pennsylvania, US
- Education: University of Denver
- Occupation: Librarian

Ralph W. Munn (September 19, 1894 – January 2, 1975) was an eminent figure in the field of American and international library and information science. Recognized by the journal American Libraries as one of "100 of the most important leaders we had in the 20th century", and described as an "administrator, educator, and author ... known for his fairness, clarity, and grace", he was also widely known within the profession as "the father of the modern library movement in Australia and New Zealand".

== Early life ==
Munn was born in Aurora, Illinois to Dr. Walter (a dentist) and Jennie W. Munn. He was raised in Colorado. He attended Ohio State University Moritz College of Law from 1912 to 1913 where he was a member of Sigma Pi fraternity. He transferred to the University of Denver where he received both his bachelor of law degree from Sturm College of Law in 1915 and bachelor of arts degrees in 1917.

He served in the United States Army from April 1917 to July 1919 in the 30th Ambulance Company. He served at Camp Dodge, Iowa from September 1917 to July 1918 and became a sergeant. He served in the headquarters of the 88th Infantry Division of the American Expeditionary Forces from August 1918 to July 1919 and served in Sorbonne, Paris from February to July 1919, He became a master hospital sergeant.

After his military service, he received his Bachelor of Library Science degree from New York State Library School at Albany in 1921. Thereafter, worked as a librarian at the Seattle Public Library in Washington state and later at the Flint Public Library in Michigan, before finally accepting the position of Director of the Carnegie Library of Pittsburgh, from 1928 to 1964, during which time he also served as Director, then Dean, of the Carnegie Library School of Carnegie Institute of Technology.

== Professional career ==
The highlights of Munn's contributions to his field during his tenure as Director of the Carnegie Library of Pittsburgh can be summarized chiefly as the perpetration of the idea of the public library as "educational, informational, and cultural", the expansion and unification of library services, and his influence in establishing an American-modeled library system and professional librarianship in Australia and New Zealand.

=== Controversial policy ===
Munn's view of the library as "educational, informational, and cultural" sparked controversy. His preference for a high-quality collection over popularly requested materials led to a "revised book selection policy that sharply defined and limited the purchase of 'light, recreational fiction' and effectively eliminated the acquisition of books that he categorized as 'shopping bag fiction'." This choice significantly benefited the reputation of the Carnegie Library of Pittsburgh, but brought into question problematic and complex issues that still affect the field today, e.g., neutrality in acquisitions, the role of the librarian in acquiring popular vs. "educational" or "literary" materials, etc.

=== Expansion and unification of library services ===
Munn "expressed grave concern over the great masses without ready access to public library services", reaching out in particular to young people and rural areas through bookmobile services and free borrowing privileges. He was also lauded for his role in the 1956 merger of the Carnegie Free Library of Allegheny and the Carnegie Library of Pittsburgh.

However, Munn's role in expanding and unifying library services was also not without criticism. One critic of Munn's 1936 pamphlet Conditions and Trends in Education for Librarianship contended that Munn, at that time considered a progressive in the field, essentially was too conservative in his views on limiting advanced technical training for graduate school librarians, making the point that "as long as he [Munn] limits library training ... to contemporary library practices and existing library forms, he definitely omits consideration of the non-serviced areas and groups."

In future writings, however, Munn seemed to look beyond the historical limitations of the library system into a present and future rapidly changing due to technological innovations. In a 1954 essay, he acknowledged that "the large library must have some staff members whose expertness in personnel management, public relations, audio-visual materials and equipment, adult education, and the public school curriculum is far more important than absorption in purely cultural interests." In addition to his revised views on the training and role of librarians, the essay brought into question the role of books and libraries themselves in the lives of the changing public. Indeed, if the following passage were altered to reflect 21st century technology terminology, Munn would seem to be speaking directly to today's librarians:

With entertainment and information available in every man's living room by the mere turning of a knob, or at the nearest newsstand at modest cost, there is little incentive for the casual reader to go to a somewhat distant library for a book. The librarian can no longer win success for his library by simply providing a stack of readable books.

=== Work in Australia and New Zealand ===
In 1934, Munn was commissioned by the Carnegie Corporation of New York to conduct a survey of public libraries in Australia and New Zealand, which he did in conjunction with Ernest Pitt, then Chief Librarian of the Public Library of Victoria. The resulting Munn-Pitt Report had a major impact in Australia. In an article published in the Australian Library Journal evaluating the survey's impact, the author states that "the key recommendations of the Munn-Pitt report were easily identified by its lay readers: 1. to establish tax-supported municipal 'free libraries'; and 2. to strengthen and extend librarianship by professionalizing the training and registration of librarians."

Munn certainly did his part to assist in the latter recommendation, drafting a number of young Australian professionals to work in American libraries and assisting them however possible. One such librarian recalled Munn in a positive light, saying, "Not only did he make places on his staff available, he also took a personal interest in each Australian 'incumbent', ensuring that, at all times, they were treated in the same way as their American colleagues, in such matters as salary and staff activities."

The assistance of these predominantly female librarians also brings into focus an uncannily prescient viewpoint that Munn established in an aptly titled Library Journal essay, "It Is a Mistake to Recruit Men". Just after World War II, there was a great increase in men looking for jobs, and Munn was of the opinion that in the case of jobs in the library field, these men were "simply looking for a secure and not too difficult job." Recruiting men into the field, continued Munn, would

operate against the profession, both by filling it with men of mediocre caliber and by discouraging the entrance of superior women ... Throughout the predictable future, it is sure to be mainly a woman's occupation. It should, therefore, be kept attractive to the ablest of women.

== Legacy ==
Munn's tenure at the Carnegie Public Library ended upon his October 1, 1964 retirement. He died in Pittsburgh on January 2, 1975. In recognition of his authorship and outreach and development of services directed at young people, the annual "Ralph Munn Creative Writing Contest" has been established in his name at the Carnegie Library of Pittsburgh.

== Honors and accomplishments ==
In his career, Munn earned a number of honors, including:

- Pennsylvania Library Association President, 1930–31
- Association of American Library Schools, President, 1935–36
- American Library Association President, 1939–40
- Honorary Degree of Doctor of Laws, 1940, University of Pittsburgh
- Distinguished Service Award, 1959, Pennsylvania Library Association
- Honorary Degree of Doctor of Laws, 1960, Waynesburg College in Pennsylvania
- Director Emeritus, 1964, Carnegie Library of Pittsburgh

Non-profit organization positions
Preceded by Milton James Ferguson	President of the American Library Association; 1939–1940	Succeeded by Essae Martha Culver
