= Library Act 1939 =

New South Wales legislation about public libraries

The Library Act 1939 is a piece of legislation in New South Wales, Australia. It was passed by the New South Wales parliament in 1939 but not enacted until 1944, after being postponed due to World War II priorities. The act outlines the responsibilities of local libraries and the rules they must abide by in order to receive state funding.

== Purpose ==
The purpose of the act is to encourage local government areas to create local public libraries. It is an agreement between the New South Wales state government and local councils who choose to adopt the act, that the state government will provide local councils with library funding if they agree to the rules set out in the act. The act is administered by the Library Council of New South Wales, via the State Library of New South Wales.

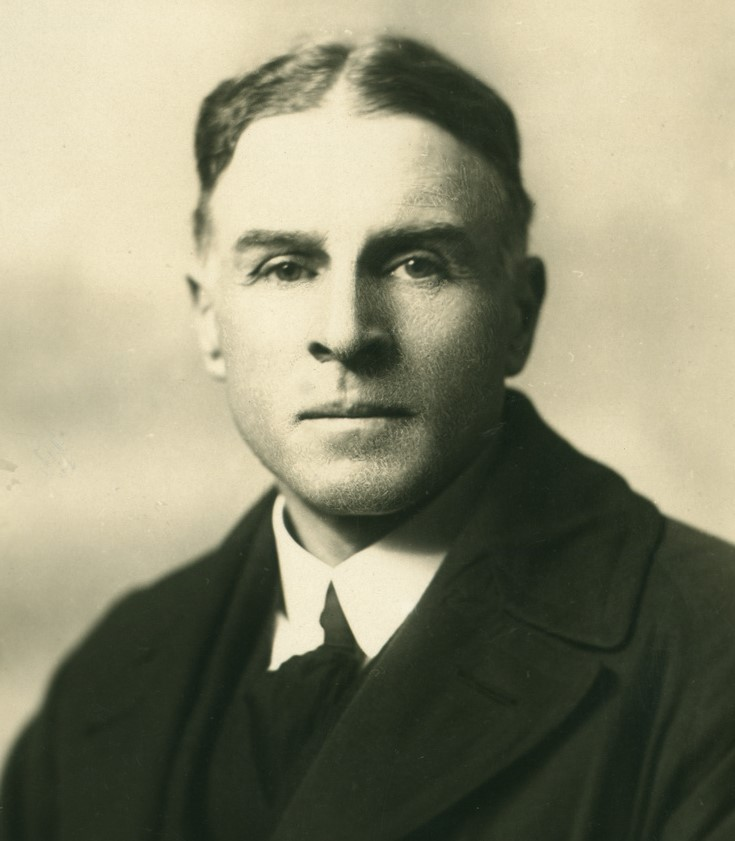
William Herbert Ifould, one of the writers of the original bill

== History ==
The act was written by Libraries Advisory Board towards the end of the free library movement. It was primarily written by William Herbert Ifould, John Metcalfem, Geoffrey Cochrane Remington and George Brain. It was written in response to the 1934 Munn-Pitt report, which claimed that free public libraries in Australia were behind those in the United Kingdom and the United States of America, and recommended more effort be made to establish public libraries in every Local Government Area. Critics argued that a Library Act was unnecessary, and that regulations for libraries should be included in a local government act instead.

The act was passed by the New South Wales Parliament on 3 November 1939. It was expected that the act would be implemented within six months, on the 22nd December 1939, but it was put on hold with the outbreak of World War II. The Libraries Advisory Board canvassed for support from the Taxpayers Association, journalists, and business leaders. However, as World War II continued, library issues were not a priority.

In 1943, NSW premier William McKell stated that the Library Act would take effect from 1 January 1944 at the official opening of a new Public Library of New South Wales (later the State Library) building.

By the middle of 1945, 32 councils had adopted the act. More councils continued to adopt the act through the 1950s and 1960s, and libraries were established in rural areas throughout the 70s.

== Amendments ==
=== Library (Amendment) Act 1992 ===
Section 10 of the act was amended by the Library (Amendment) Act 1992 (No. 40 of 1992) to specify that membership, access to certain materials, delivery of books to those unable to get to a library, and reference services should be free of charge.

=== Statute Law (Miscellaneous Provisions) Act 2005 ===
The Statute Law (Miscellaneous Provisions) Act 2005 also amended the Library Act 1939, changing "book" to "library material" as non-print material became more common in libraries.

=== Library Amendment Act 2011 (NSW) ===
The Library Amendment Act 2011 (NSW) amended section 12 of the Library Act 13939 to allow libraries to work collaboratively rather than each library being only responsible for its own LGA.

=== The Library Amendment (Freedom to Collect) Bill 2026 ===
Prior to 2026, attempted censorship in public libraries had been increasing. This included the attempted 2024 Cumberland book ban when New South Wales Minister for Arts, John Graham accused Cumberland City Council of breaking the Library Council of NSW's Guideline on Freedom of Access of Information, which is issued under the powers granted by the Library Act 1939, meaning they were at risk of losing their state funding.

The Library Amendment (Freedom to Collect) Bill 2026 was passed in May 2026 to amend section 10(1) of the Library Act 1939 to help protect libraries facing censorship challenges. While stipulations regarding censorship were already discussed in the act, the amendment strengthened them.

== See also ==
- List of libraries in New South Wales
