= Australian Library and Information Association =

Peak professional organisation for the Australian library and information services sector

Australian Library and Information Association (ALIA)
- Founded: 1937
- Location: Deakin, Australian Capital Territory, Australia
- Region served: Australian librarians, library technicians, libraries and related organisations
- Key people: Lisa Bateman (2026–2029 President), Cathie Warburton (CEO)
- Website: alia.org.au

The Australian Library and Information Association (ALIA), formerly the Australian Institute of Librarians and Library Association of Australia, is the peak professional organisation for the Australian library and information services sector. Founded in 1937, its headquarters are in Canberra.

ALIA publishes a quarterly scholarly journal, Journal of the Australian Library and Information Association, and a bimonthly news magazine for members, INCITE. The Association hosts a number of conferences which take place in different places around Australia.

== History ==
On 20 August 1937, a meeting of 55 librarians at the Albert Hall in Canberra formed the Australian Institute of Librarians in response to the Munn-Pitt survey. The foundation president was William Herbert Ifould, the Principal Librarian at the Public Library of New South Wales. John Metcalfe, Deputy Principal Librarian at the Public Library of New South Wales was the first honorary general secretary and drafted much of the original constitution.

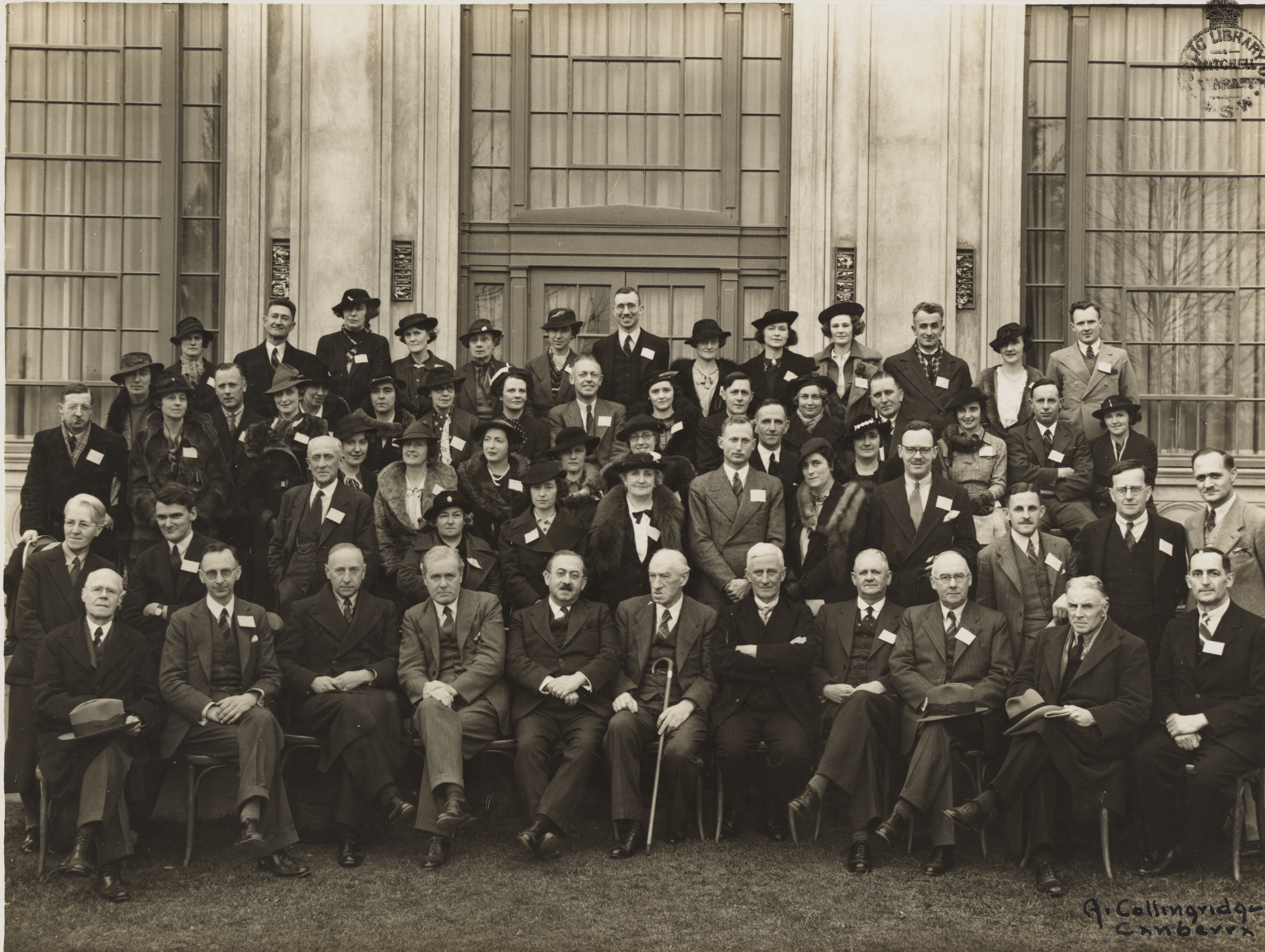
Group photograph of the delegates attending the Australian Institute of Librarians' inaugural meeting at Canberra, 20 August 1937.

In 1949, the institute changed its name to the Library Association of Australia, and was renamed again 1989 to its current name of the Australian Library and Information Association and a permanent office was established in Canberra.

The Archives section, which had existed between 1951 and 1973, became the Australian Society of Archivists in 1975.

== Governance and description ==
The Association is governed by a constitution and a board of directors who are voted on by members for two year terms.

ALIA National Office staff are based in ALIA House in Australia's capital, Canberra.

== Membership ==
General memberships are open to anyone interested in the Australian library sector, while professional memberships are only available to those working in the sector or with an ALIA-accredited degree in library science or library technician degree.

== Activities ==
ALIA has created public campaigns to promote libraries and learning, including Library Lovers Day, Library and Information Week, Information Awareness Week, National Simultaneous Storytime, and the national Summer Reading Club.

== Education ==
ALIA manages the standards for library and information science education within Australia, and provides accreditation for certain TAFE and university (both graduate and post graduate) courses.

ALIA offers training to library science students and those working in the library sector, including mentorship programs, and a Professional Development Scheme.

== Publications ==
=== Journal of the Australian Library and Information Association (JALIA) ===
JALIA is a quarterly scholarly journal, named as of Volume 66, Issue 1, 2017; a merger of the Australian Library Journal (ALJ) (1951 to 2016), and Australian Academic and Research Libraries (AARL) (1970 to 2016).

=== INCITE ===
INCITE (also styled Incite, inCite and InCite), a news magazine for members, published six times a year as of 2021, (formerly 12-20 times a year). It was first published in January 1980. Issues dating from Volume 33, issue 1/2 (January/February 2012) are available via National edeposit, Issues from 1980 to 2016 are available as scanned electronic versions on AustLII, and many back issues (until 2020, as of March 2021) are also on the Informit database. Since 2018, some whole issues of INCITE are produced in a freely available digital-only format each year, with one article from each print issue also freely available online, on the ALIA website.

== Conferences ==
ALIA hosts a number of conferences which are rotated around Australia:

- ALIA Information Online Conference
- ALIA National Conference
- ALIA New Librarians' Symposium
- ALIA National Library and Information Technicians' Symposium

== See also ==
- Anne Clyde
- William Herbert Ifould
- Patricia Gallaher
- John Brudenall (librarian)
- Australian Museums and Galleries Association
