= An heiligen Wassern =

An heiligen Wassern may refer to:

- An heiligen Wassern, an 1898 novel by Jakob Christoph Heer
- Sacred Waters (1932 film), a German film based on the novel by Jakob Christoph Heer
- Sacred Waters (1960 film), a Swiss film based on the novel by Jakob Christoph Heer
