= Sacred Waters (disambiguation) =

Sacred waters are natural water features that have attained religious significance.

Sacred Waters may also refer to:

- Sacred Waters (1932 film), a German film
- Sacred Waters (1960 film), a Swiss film
