= Sutherland Shire Libraries =

Australian public library system

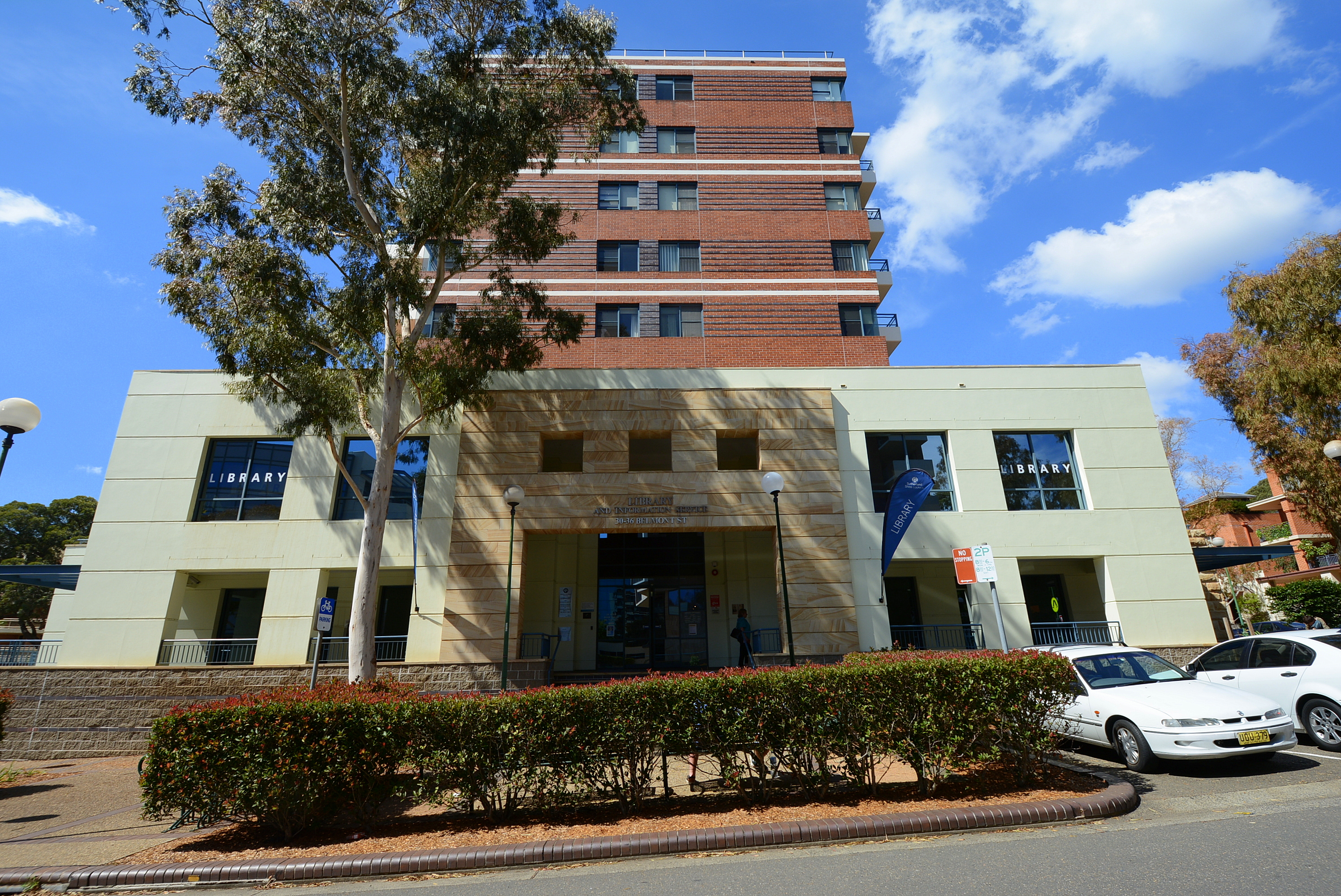
- Sutherland Library main branch
- Location: Sutherland, Sydney, New South Wales, Australia
- Type: Public
- Established: 1953; 73 years ago
- Reference to legal mandate: Library Act 1939
- Branches: 9

Collection
- Items collected: Books, DVDs, CDs, magazines, newspapers
- Size: 372,518 as of 2015

Access and use
- Population served: 225,070 as of 2014

Other information
- Employees: 62.83 as of 2015
- Website: www.sutherlandshire.nsw.gov.au/Community/Library

Sutherland Shire Libraries is an Australian public library system which serves the Sutherland Shire, in Sydney, New South Wales. It was officially established in 1953. As of June 2016, the library had 76,389 registered members, and a collection of 367,049 items. There are eight branches in the system, named after the suburbs in which they are located.

== Branches ==
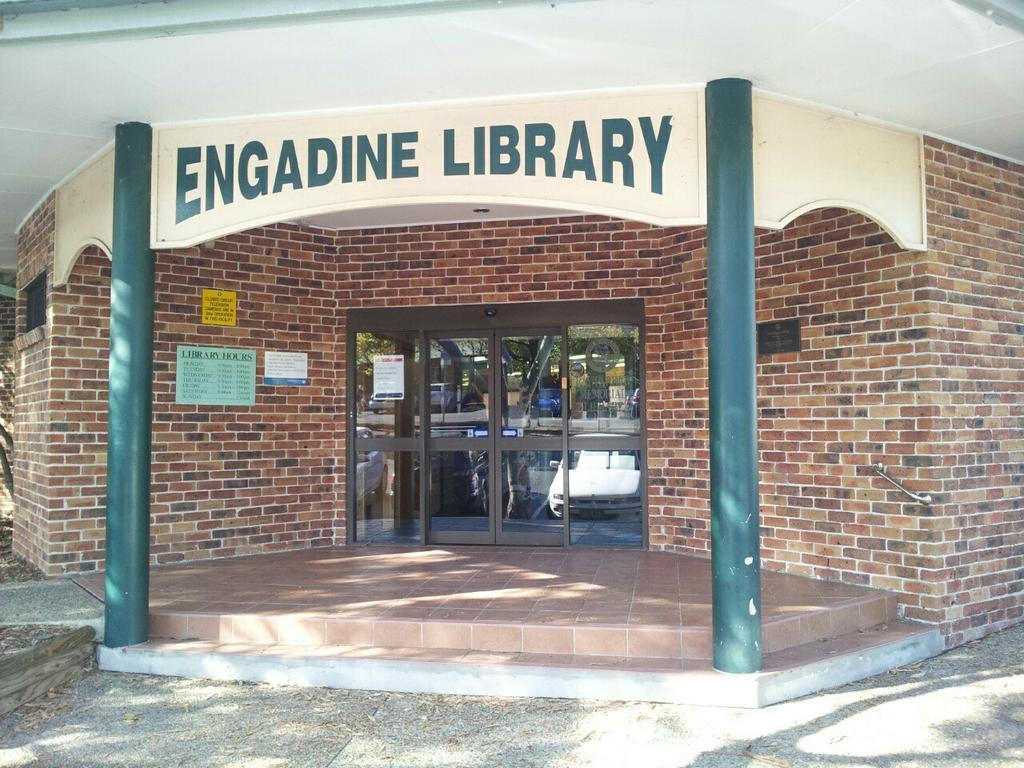
Engadine Library, circa. 2013

There are nine branches in the Sutherland Shire Libraries system, named after the suburbs in which they are located.

- Sutherland (Officially the Athol Hill MBE Memorial Library)
- Cronulla
- Caringbah
- Miranda
- Sylvania (Located within Southgate Shopping Centre)
- Menai
- Engadine
- Bundeena (Located within Bundeena Public School, open Mondays, Wednesdays and Saturdays)
- Kirrawee (officially Kirrawee Library+, Located in South Village Shopping Centre)

== Collection ==
Sutherland Shire Libraries had a total stock of 372,518 items as of June 2015, and 367,049 as of June 2016. The main community language collections are held at Sutherland, Menai and Sylvania libraries, covering Arabic, Chinese, Greek and Russian. As of June 2015, adult fiction was 24.73% of the total library collection.

Sutherland Shire Libraries offers several different platforms for audiobooks and eBooks. It offers free music MP3 downloads from Sony Music, Kanopy on-demand video streaming, access to LinkedIn Learning, and a number of research databases, mostly available online with a library card. Sutherland Shire Libraries also offer Encyclopædia Britannica, Consumer Health Complete, information about health for the general public, Gale Virtual Reference Library, Infobase ebooks, Salem Press biographies, and the Standards Australia building standards in-library.

Sutherland Shire Libraries maintains a collection development policy, and a local studies collection policy.

In the Local Studies collection, several historical photographs have been digitised and put online. It keeps a historical newspaper index dating back to 1900. Several oral histories with early residents of the area have been recorded and transcribed on the website, released under a Creative Commons license. Historical studies, videos, and pathfinders are available on local topics.

== Services ==
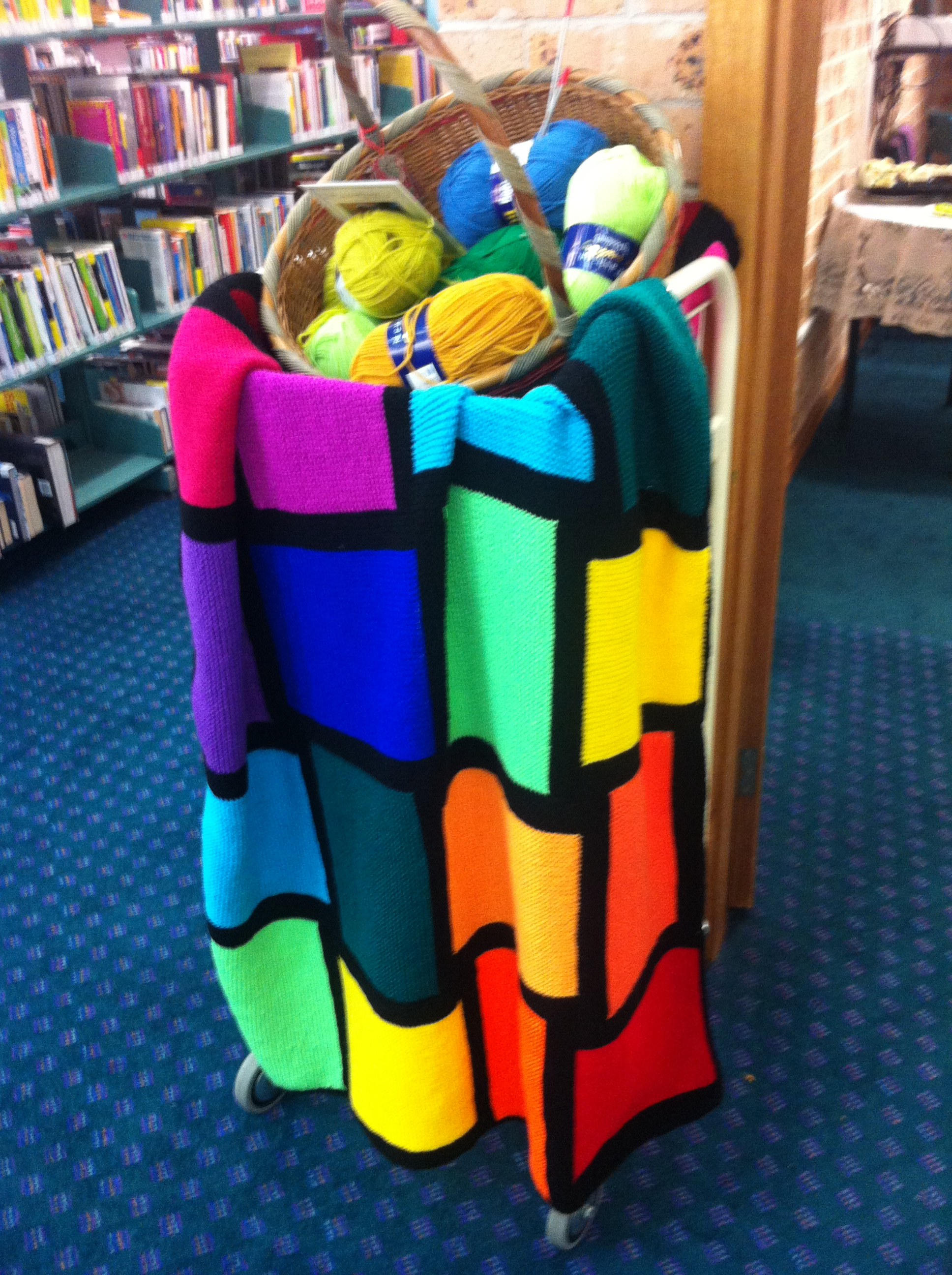
A Wrap with Love knitting club display at Engadine Library.

The library offers reader's advisory services, book clubs, author talks, and interlibrary loans. Storytimes are available for young children, and the library supports the Premier's Reading Challenge. The library runs activities for Children's Book Week in August, and coding and robotics workshops are offered for children. LEGO construction clubs are offered in Sylvania and Engadine. For older people, home library services, knitting clubs, and technology classes are offered. International English Language Testing System (IELTS) online courses are provided. The library provides lectures about Higher School Certificate topics, a study skills online resource, and lists of related texts for HSC English topics. Quiet study spaces are also provided for HSC students. All branches except Bundeena have internet-connected computers available for hire. Most branches have four hours of free Wi-Fi access, with a login using a library card. Photocopying is available at all branches, and some offer scanning and fax services. A monthly meeting is held at Sutherland Library's makerspace. The library has held an annual book sale since 1989 which lasts over three days, which fund furniture and equipment for the libraries. Energy-monitor devices and sustainability kits for households have also been available to borrow from the libraries, and batteries, cables and small e-waste items can be recycled at the Caringbah branch. The library also offers an app which allows users to search the collection, check out books, and manage their account.

The Library website's homepage had 320,883 hits in 2014–15, and 346,920 in 2015–16.

== Population served ==
As of June 2015, the library had 69,740 registered members. Of these, 4,922 were non-local to the area. As of June 2016, the library had 76,389 registered members. Of these, 5,743 were non-local to the area.

== History ==
Prior to Sutherland Shire Libraries, a free library for unemployed people operated in Engadine as of 1937. In 1950, the Kirrawee Progress Association asked Sutherland Shire Council to establish a library of non-fiction. Sutherland Shire Council adopted the Library Act 1939 (NSW) in 1952, which provided free library services for people in New South Wales. Cronulla School of the Arts offered their library space for the library-to-be in 1953. Sutherland Library opened in 1953 in the home of a former doctor, with 8000 books. In 1955, the Miranda and Cronulla branches opened. In 1964, Miranda Library moved into Miranda Fair. Part of the School of the Arts was used for the Cronulla branch when it opened. The Cronulla branch moved into the old Methodist church on Surf Road in 1969.

In the Sydney Subject Specialisation Scheme, a defunct Sydney-wide collection development agreement which facilitated interlibrary loans since 1962, prior to the advent of computerised union catalogues, Sutherland Shire Libraries maintained a focus on philosophy, psychology, aquariums, chemical technology and Dutch literature.

In 1989, Sutherland Shire Libraries withdrew The Satanic Verses from circulation due to a bomb threat.

In 1994, the central branch of the library moved to Eton Street.

In 2004, Sutherland Library staff won a Guinness World Record to be the longest read-alouders, with a time of 81 hours and 15 minutes.

RFID tags were implemented in 2008, allowing library users to check out books themselves.

In 2011, a fire was started in Cronulla Library's return chute.

In 2013, free Wi-Fi was introduced at the Sutherland, Menai, Engadine, Miranda, Caringbah and Cronulla branches. A strategic planning document tabled by PricewaterhouseCoopers for Sutherland Shire Council in the same year recommended the closure of two library branches.

In the lead-up to the 2015 state election, Sutherland Shire Council, as the governing body of Sutherland Shire Libraries, advocated for more state funding to be allocated for library services.

In 2015, Sutherland Library bought a 3D printer and opened a library makerspace. Weekend hours for Sutherland and Cronulla were extended in the same year, by increasing use of volunteers. The library subscribed to the BorrowBox e-book service in 2015. Sutherland Shire Libraries won the 2015 LIAC Centre of Excellence Award for their partnership with the Sutherland Local Court and their Law Week activities. A justice of the peace help desk was offered at Cronulla library beginning in 2015.

Fines for overdue books were abolished as of 2021.

The central branch was proposed to move to Kirrawee as part of the South Village shopping centre, but this was later scrapped. A 'technology-focused library and community hub' is now planned to operate in the South Village complex, with a slated opening of April 2025. Opening hours for other libraries in the system were lowered to accommodate the new opening hours for the Kirrawee branch. As of the new plan, Sutherland Shire Libraries had 402 staffed hours across the system, placing it in the top 3 library systems in the state for opening hours.

== See also ==
- Sydney Institute of TAFE - Gymea and Loftus campuses maintain libraries for their students.
- Hazelhurst Regional Gallery and Arts Centre - often partners with Sutherland Shire Libraries for art exhibitions, as a nearby GLAM organisation.
