= Colani =

Colani is a surname. Notable people with the surname include:

- Gian Marchet Colani (1772–1837), Swiss hunter and mountain guide
- Luigi Colani (1928–2019), German industrial designer
- Madeleine Colani (1866–1943), French archaeologist
- Victor Colani (1895–1957), German actor
