= Eternal Love (1929 film) =

1929 film by Ernst Lubitsch

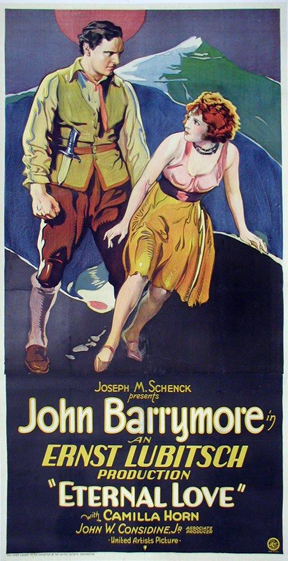
- Theatrical release poster
- Directed by: Ernst Lubitsch
- Written by: Katherine Hilliker (titles); Harry H. Caldwell (titles)
- Screenplay by: Hans Kraly
- Based on: Der König der Bernina by Jakob Christoph Heer
- Produced by: Joseph Schenck; John Considine W. Jr.
- Starring: John Barrymore; Camilla Horn
- Cinematography: Oliver T. Marsh; Charles Rosher
- Edited by: Andrew Marton
- Music by: Hugo Riesenfeld
- Production company: Joseph M. Schenck Productions
- Distributed by: United Artists
- Release date: May 11, 1929 (USA)
- Running time: 71 minutes
- Country: United States
- Languages: Sound (Synchronized); English Intertitles
- Budget: $1.1 million

Eternal Love is a 1929 American sound romantic drama film directed by Ernst Lubitsch and starring John Barrymore and Camilla Horn. While the film has no audible dialog, it was released with a synchronized musical score with sound effects using both the sound-on-disc and sound-on-film process. Based on the novel Der Koenig der Bernina by Jakob Christoph Heer, the film is about two lovers living in the Swiss Alps who struggle to be together and escape their loveless marriages. Eternal Love was the last silent film for both Lubitsch and Barrymore.

The story was remade as the 1957 Austrian film The King of Bernina.

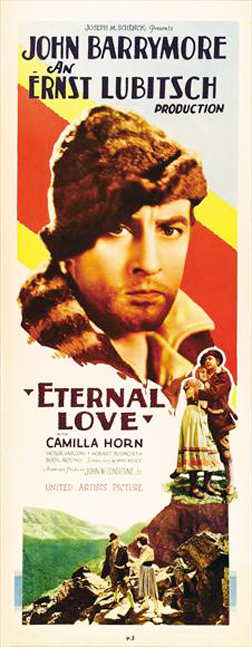
Alternative theatrical poster

== Plot ==
Eternal Love (1929)

In 1806 in the village of Pontresina, Switzerland, a mountain man named Marcus is in love with Ciglia, a young village woman who has been rejecting the advances of Lorenz. The mischievous Pia throws herself at Marcus, but she is also rejected. Marcus and Ciglia profess their love, while the jealous and vindictive Pia looks on.

Following the end of the French Army occupation, the people of Pontresina celebrate their liberation with a boisterous masked dance. At the party Ciglia becomes frightened of a drunken Marcus and she asks to be taken home. Marcus goes home confused. When Pia boldly attempts to seduce Marcus, he accepts her advances. The next day Ciglia receives permission from her uncle Tass to marry Marcus. Pia and her mother approach Tass, and then confront Marcus. With Ciglia overhearing, they demand that Marcus marry Pia, who plays the cowering innocent. Ciglia leaves Marcus, and Marcus and Pia get married. Lorenz soon takes advantage of Ciglia and eventually they also get married.

During a heavy snowstorm, Pia is worried about Marcus and tries to form a rescue party to find him. With no one willing to join, she turns to Lorenz and Ciglia. Ciglia overreacts to the news, making Lorenz suspicious about her affections. Ciglia soon discovers Marcus safely arriving in the village. Consumed in jealously and sorrow, Lorenz confronts Marcus, urging him to leave the village, even offering him money, but Marcus refuses.

Later in the mountains, Lorenz ambushes Marcus and the two exchange gunfire. Marcus returns to the village, followed by the accusing and dying Lorenz. The villagers turn against Marcus despite Ciglia's cries of his innocence. Pia falsely accuses Ciglia of putting Marcus up to the murder of Lorenz. Soon the villagers turn into a mob and pursue Marcus and Ciglia into the mountains. With no other recourse, Marcus and Ciglia walk hand in hand into the path of an avalanche.

== Cast ==
- John Barrymore as Marcus Baltran
- Camilla Horn as Ciglia
- Victor Varconi as Lorenz Gruber
- Mona Rico as Pia
- Hobart Bosworth as Reverend Tass
- Evelyn Selbie as Pia's mother
- Bodil Rosing as housekeeper
- Constantine Romanoff as villager (uncredited)

== Music ==
The film features a theme song entitled "Eternal Love" which was composed by Ballard MacDonald, Peter DeRose and Dave Dreyer.

== Production ==
Filming locations

- Lake Louise, Banff National Park, Alberta, Canada

== Reception ==
In his review in The New York Times, Mordaunt Hall wrote, "Although it is capably acted and intelligently directed, with excellent scenic effects and settings, the story is not especially moving, which appears to be partly due to the sketchiness of the script." Hall found the acting to be generally good, describing Barrymore's work as "excellent" although having a "tendency to be too melodramatic". Hall described Horn's performance as "charmingly sympathetic, despite a touch too much of mascaro on her eyes". Finally, Hall applauded Lubitsch's Alpine scenes which he described as "realistic" and giving "a reasonably impressive conception of an avalanche during the closing stretches".

In his review of the DVD on filmcritic.com, Christopher Null wrote:

Amazing for a silent-era film, Ernst Lubitsch's story of love, war, and tragedy on a Swiss mountaintop will have you in tears by its finale. John Barrymore is typically stoic as the hero, a hunter who, during the 1806 occupation by French soldiers, refuses to hand in his gun—the desperado of the village. He needs his gun to protect his lady friend, Ciglia (Camilla Horn), with whom he is deeply in love. Alas there's also a troublesome mountain girl named Pia (Mona Rico), who's making a testy situation even worse. Pia engineers trouble, and soon our two heroes are on the run for their lives... and their love. Sounds sappy, but the photography is unforgettable and the finale is devastating. Restored for this video release from an acetate print languishing in the bowels of UCLA's film center, Eternal Love is absolutely worth a look if you're a fan of the silent era. You'll love it. Eternally.

== Preservation status ==
This film was thought to be lost until a 16 mm print was found in the film collection of Mary Pickford, and was released with its Vitaphone music-and-sound effects track in the 1990s. The film was given a DVD release on April 24, 2001.

== See also ==
- List of early sound feature films (1926–1929)
