= Shanghai Lady =

1929 film

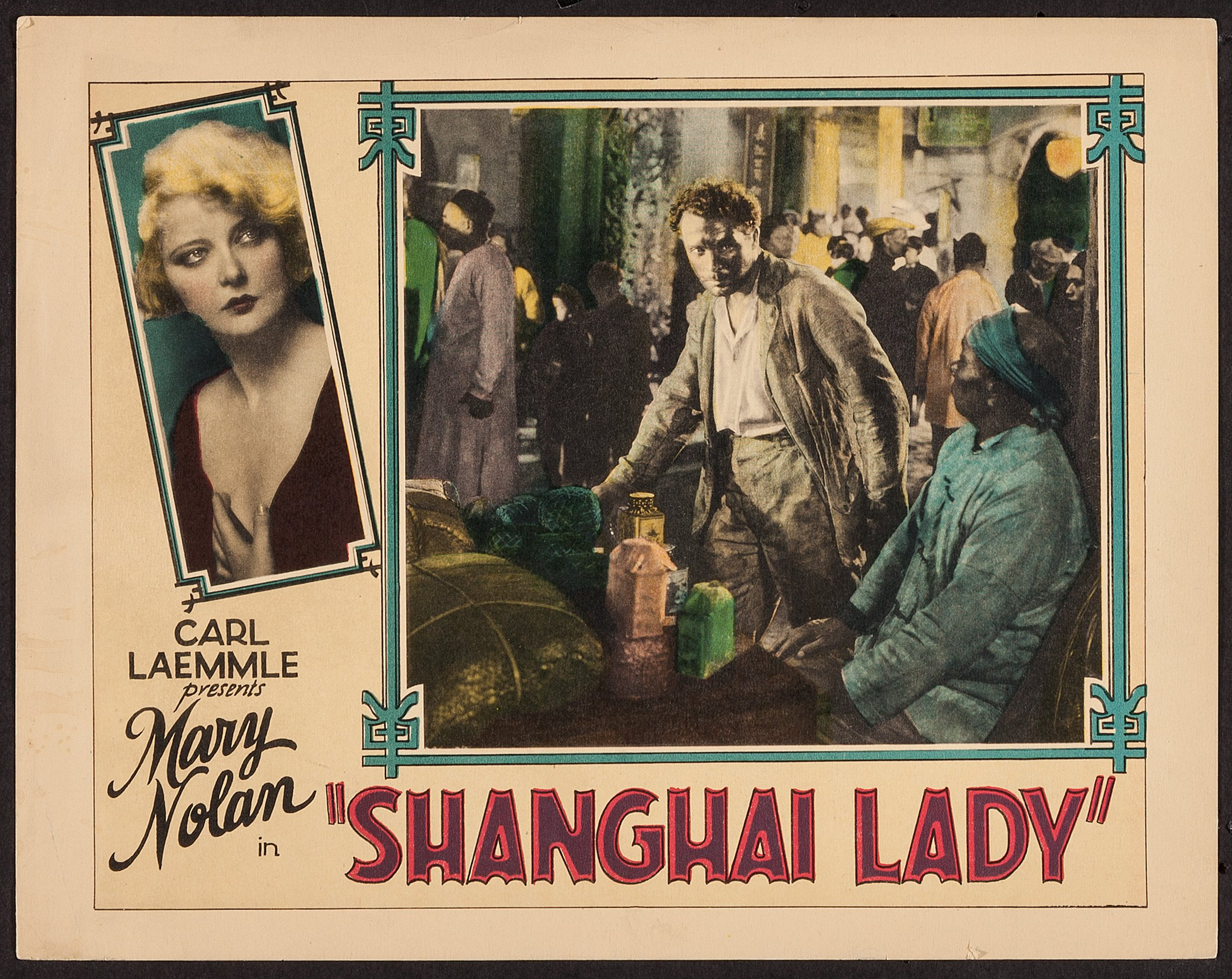
- Lobby card
- Directed by: John S. Robertson
- Screenplay by: Houston Branch; Winifred Reeve
- Based on: Drifting (play) by: John Colton; Daisy H. Andrews
- Starring: Mary Nolan; James Murray; Lydia Yeamans Titus; Wheeler Oakman; Anders Randolf; Yola d'Avril
- Cinematography: Hal Mohr
- Edited by: Milton Carruth
- Production company: Universal Pictures
- Distributed by: Universal Pictures
- Release date: November 17, 1929
- Running time: 66 minutes
- Country: United States
- Language: English

Shanghai Lady is a 1929 American pre-Code drama film directed by John S. Robertson and written by Houston Branch and Winnifred Reeve. It is based on the 1910 play Drifting by John Colton and Daisy H. Andrews. The film stars Mary Nolan, James Murray, Lydia Yeamans Titus, Wheeler Oakman, Anders Randolf, and Yola d'Avril. The film was released on November 17, 1929, by Universal Pictures.

== Cast ==
- Mary Nolan as Cassie Cook
- James Murray as 'Badlands' McKinney
- Lydia Yeamans Titus as Polly Voo
- Wheeler Oakman as Repen
- Anders Randolf as Mandarin
- Yola d'Avril as Lizzie
- Mona Rico as Rose
- James B. Leong as Counselor
- Irma Lowe as Golden Almond

== Music ==
The film featured a theme song entitled "I Wonder If It's Really Love" with words and music by Bernie Grossman and Arthur Sizemore.

== See also ==
- List of early sound feature films (1926–1929)
