= Gian Marchet Colani =

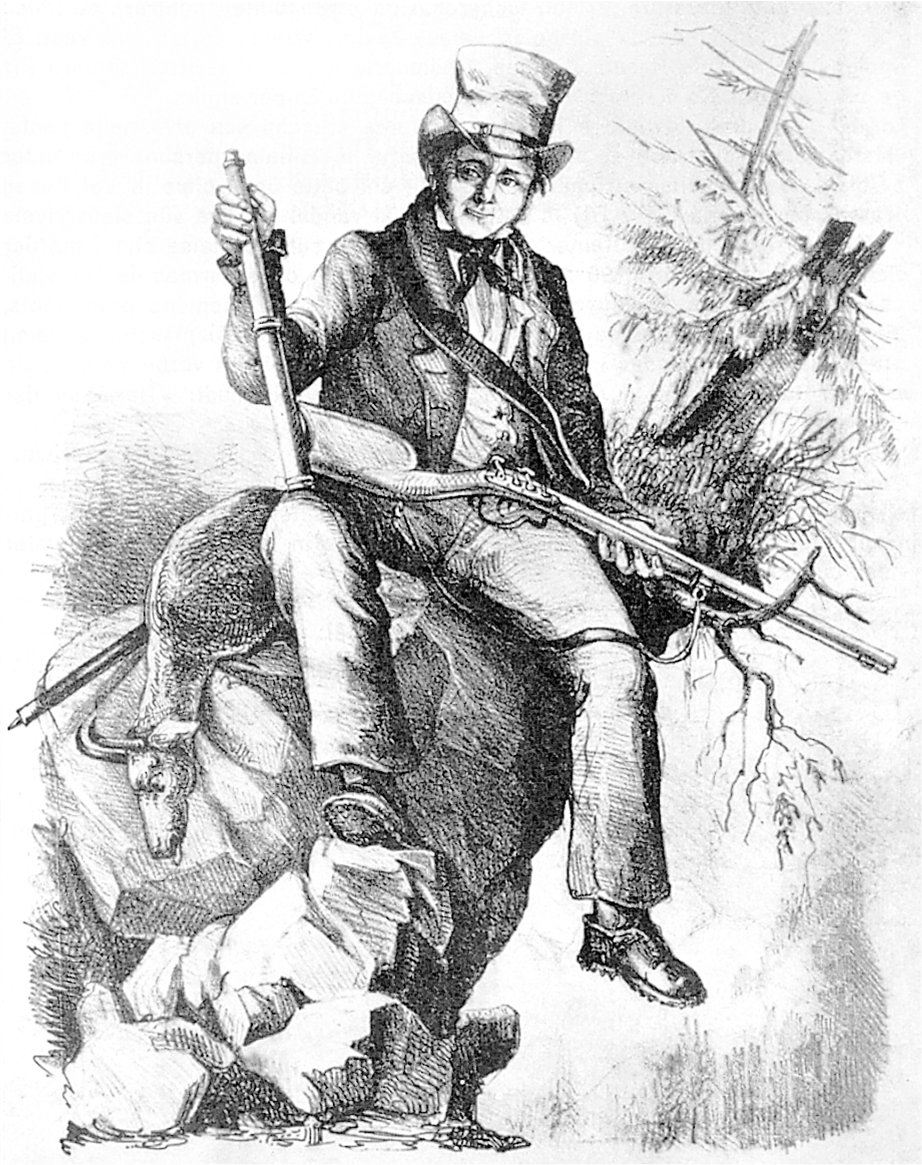

Gian Marchet Colani (19 June 1772 – 14 August 1837) was a legendary Swiss marksman and alpine guide who was famed for his marskmanship and thought to have shot numerous bears and nearly 2700 chamois. He inspired the character Markus Paltram in the novel Der König der Bernina by Jakob Christoph Heer which was also made into a film The King of Bernina.

Colani was born in La Punt Chamues-ch, the son of a teacher and carpenter Jan Antoni and Anna Lony (or Lum). By the age of 14 he had shot 60 chamois with his father. At the age of 19 he became known as the best shooter in the Engadine. He shot many bears and nearly 2700 chamois. It was also rumoured that he shot any foreign hunters who intruded into the region. In 1835 he climbed Piz Palü along with Oswald Heer. Jakob Christoph Heer used him to model the character Markus Paltram in his novel Der König der Bernina (1900). In 1794 he married Margretta Ambass from Bever and they had a son and daughter. After differences arose between him and the family he visited France and completed his gunsmithing apprenticeship. After a divorce he worked as a locksmith and worked on a gun with a single barrel that allowed firing two shots in a row. In 1803 he moved to Pontresina and married Maria Branger from Davos. They had five children. He ran several homes, farmed and was also noted as a singer in the choir.

After a bet with a Tyrolean mower on handling the scythe to mow a meadow on his own in 1837, he contracted pneumonia and died.
