= Wrap with Love =

Australian charitable organisation

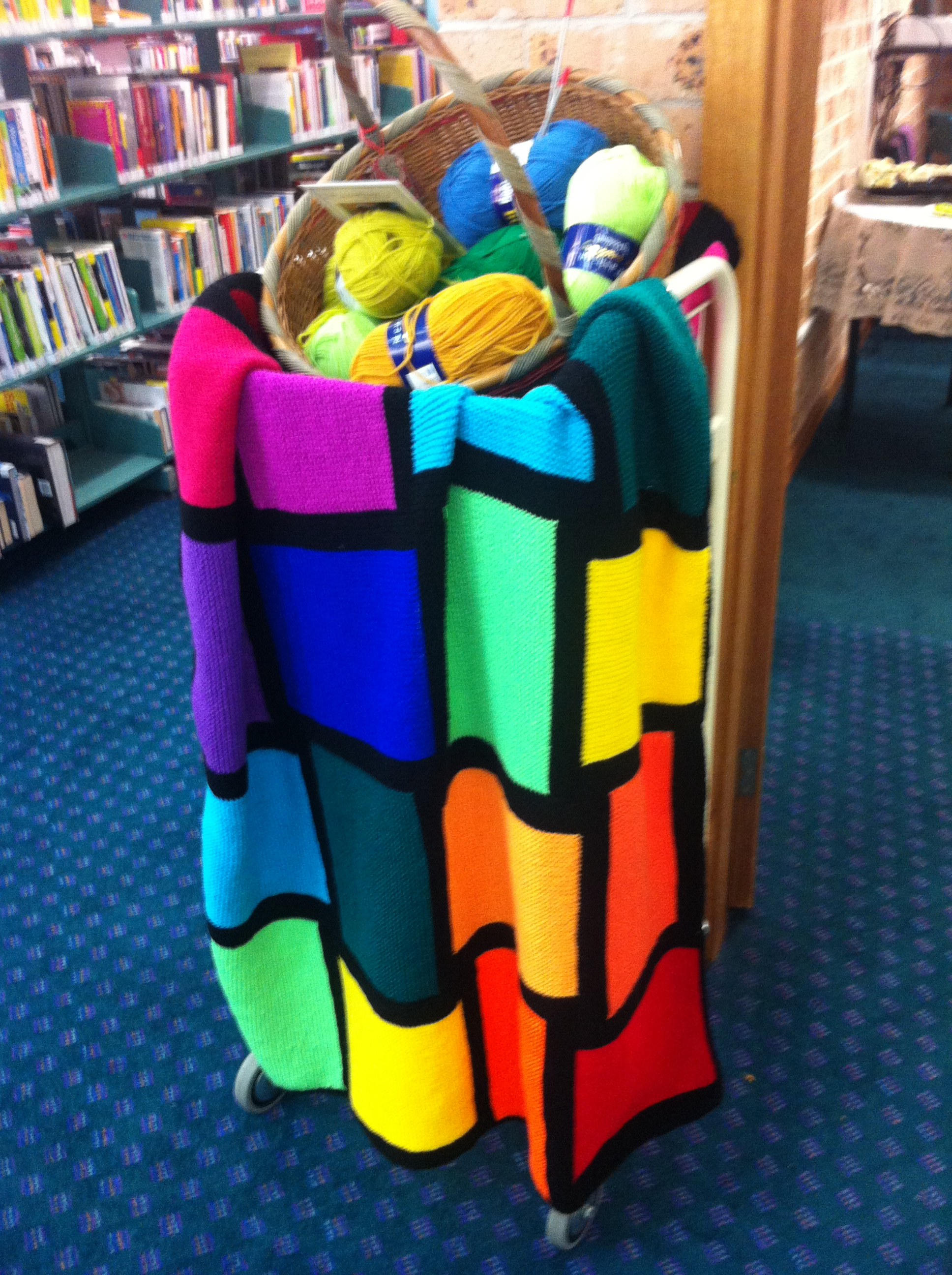
A handknitted "Wrap with Love" blanket on display at Engadine library.

Wrap with Love is an Australian charitable organisation, founded in 1992 by Sonia Gidley-King, OAM, to produce knitted wraps (used as blankets) as gifts for people who have exposed to the cold and susceptible to hypothermia and especially those who have experienced loss and trauma as a result of war. The wraps are knitted, transported and assembled by volunteers. Over 30,000 volunteers around Australia have been involved in the project and more than a quarter of a million woollen wraps have been produced. The wraps are created by knitting 28 equally sized squares in Garter stitch, sewn together into blankets of 4 x 7 squares. Although simple, this formula allows for an almost unlimited variety and the resulting wrap is a unique possession for its final owner. Some wraps incorporate a single stylised kangaroo as a symbol of their origin.

== Knit-in ==
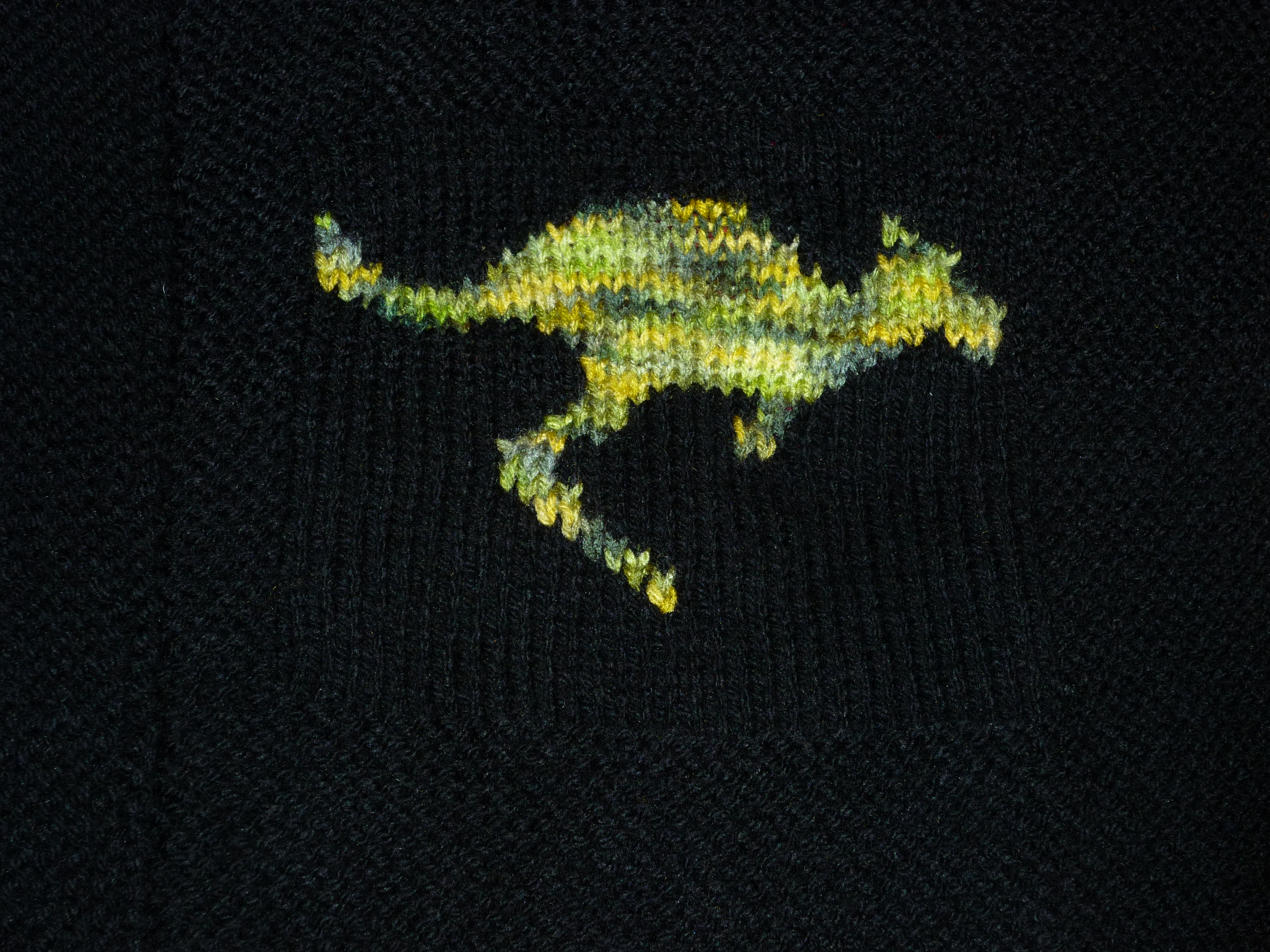
Detail of knitted wrap square with kangaroo motif

In 2003, ABC Sydney Radio Station 702 ABC Sydney and ABC Local Radio created the "knit in", so named after the "sit-in" form of direct action protest, to support the movement and increase awareness of the Wrap with Love cause. Presenter Angela Catterns is credited with the "Knit-In" idea. Other knitting events have been held at a variety of community halls and local libraries across the country.

== Collection and distribution ==
Finished wraps are collected by over twenty non-denominational and non-political aid agencies and taken to a warehouse in Alexandria, New South Wales from where they are distributed to other charities working directly with communities in need. For example, as of 2012 World Vision Australia had distributed to Armenia, Romania, Afghanistan, Mongolia, Zambia, Uganda, Rwanda, Burundi, Laos and Thailand. In 2013 they distributed a further 10,180 hand-knitted blankets and wraps to Burundi, Malawi, Mongolia, Swaziland, Uganda and Zimbabwe.

== See also ==
- Knitting clubs
