= Shadows of Glory =

1930 film

- Directed by: Andrew L. Stone; Fernando C. Tamayo
- Written by: Thomas Alexander Boyd (story)
- Starring: José Bohr; Mona Rico; Francisco Marán; César Vanoni; Demetrius Alexis; Juan Torena; Enrique Acosta; Tito Davison; Marina Ortiz; Araceli Rey
- Cinematography: Arthur Martinelli
- Edited by: Arthur Tavares
- Distributed by: Sono Art Productions
- Release date: February 1, 1930
- Running time: 106 minutes
- Country: United States
- Language: Spanish

Shadows of Glory (Spanish:Sombras de gloria) is a pre-Code Spanish-language American film released in 1930. It was produced by Sono Art-World Wide Pictures to serve as an alternate-language version of their English-language release Blaze o' Glory (1929). It was the first foreign-language sound film produced in the United States.

== Plot ==
Sombras de gloria, like Blaze o' Glory, takes its premise from the story The Long Shot by Thomas Alexander Boyd. It is part war movie, part courtroom drama.

== Cast ==
- Jose Bohr as Eddie Williams
- Mona Rico as Helen Williams
- Francisco Maran as Dr. Castelli
- Cesar Vanoni as District Attorney
- Demetrius Alexis as Carl Hummel
- Juan Torena as Jack
- Enrique Acosta as Judge

== Production and distribution ==
According to modern web sources, Sombras de gloria was shot at Metropolitan Studios in Hollywood in October 1929. The premiere took place at the studio on January 25, 1930. The film opened to the general public in the United States five days later. It is not presently available in DVD.
