= Mona Rico =

American actress (1907–1994)

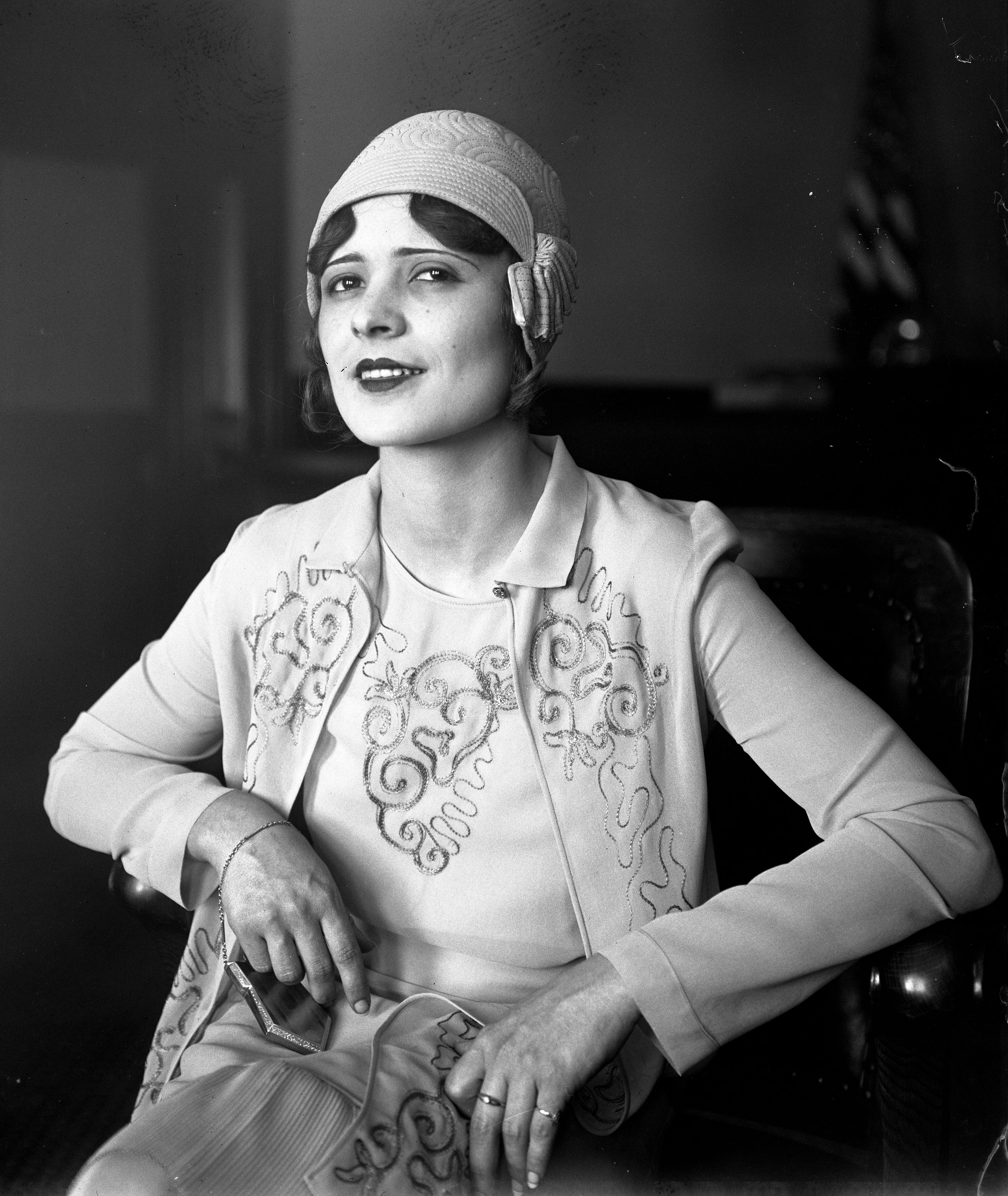
- Rico in 1928
- Born: Enriqueta de Valenzuela; July 15, 1907; Mexico City, Mexico
- Died: July 15, 1994 (aged 87); Los Angeles, California, U.S.
- Occupation: Actress
- Spouse: James N. Crofton

Mona Rico (born Enriqueta de Valenzuela; July 15, 1907 — July 15, 1994) was a Mexico-born American actress. Her films include Eternal Love (1929), Shanghai Lady (1929), A Devil With Women (1930), and Zorro Rides Again (1937).

== Career ==
Born Enriqueta de Valenzuela, she came to Hollywood from Mexico City at the age of 19 in April 1928 and secured a five-year acting contract. Her first role of significance came opposite John Barrymore as the third lead in a United Artists motion picture, Eternal Love. It was reported that she was sitting in the casting room of the studio when a girl's hands were needed in a film test being made by Ernst Lubitsch. She was sent to Lubitsch and, after her hands were recorded, he made an entire test of her. The following day she obtained her contract. She was cast as a Spanish dancing girl in Shanghai Lady.

== Personal life ==
Rico became an American citizen at age 23. She married wealthy sportsman James N. Crofton, part-owner of the Agua Caliente Club resort in Baja, California, on October 19, 1932.

On July 13, 1932, Rico was with Crofton on a plane which crashed near Mexico City. The pilot/airline owner was killed and Rico was injured. Rico filed suit for separate maintenance in March 1933 and asked for a sum of $2,000 monthly from Crofton.

In the action, Rico stated she was a motion picture actress who earned $375 per week before the wedding. However, she was no longer able to make her living as an actress because of facial injuries sustained in the airplane crash. The proceedings were later withdrawn, and a reconciliation was followed by a second honeymoon to Hawaii.

In October 1933 it was rumored that Crofton had established residence in Reno, Nevada to obtain a divorce. He denied this, saying that he was in Reno for a business trip and planned to visit Rico in San Diego, California, afterward.

On October 18, 1933, Rico obtained a divorce decree in San Diego. She charged cruelty and was awarded $500 a month alimony.

== Death ==
Rico died in Los Angeles, California on her 87th birthday, July 15, 1994.

== Filmography ==
Year	Title	Role	Notes
1929	Eternal Love	Pia	
1929	Shanghai Lady	Rose	
1930	Shadows of Glory	Helen Williams	
1930	Alma de Gaucho	Elsa	
1930	A Devil with Women	Alicia	
1930	Big Money	Maid	
1932	Thunder Below	Pajarita	Uncredited
1935	Goin' to Town	Dolores Lopez	
1937	Zorro Rides Again	Carmelita	Serial, [Chs. 1, 9]
1941	My Life with Caroline	Minor Role	Uncredited, (final film role)

== Sources ==
- Daily Northwestern, "Hollywood Film Shop", September 8, 1928, p. 12.
- Los Angeles Times, "Mona Rico Has Just Finished Third Talkie", October 27, 1929, p. 24.
- Los Angeles Times, "Gilpin Dies In Crash", July 14, 1932, p. 1.
- Los Angeles Times, "Turfman Accused In Wife's Action", March 25, 1933, p. A1.
- Oakland Tribune, "Actress' Mate Denies Divorce", October 11, 1933, p. 9.
- Los Angeles Times, "Mona Rico Wins Divorce Decree", October 19, 1933, p. 6.
- Los Angeles Times, "She Plans Bid For Citizenship", May 27, 1934, p. 17.
