= Caspar Ritter =

Swiss painter (1861–1923)

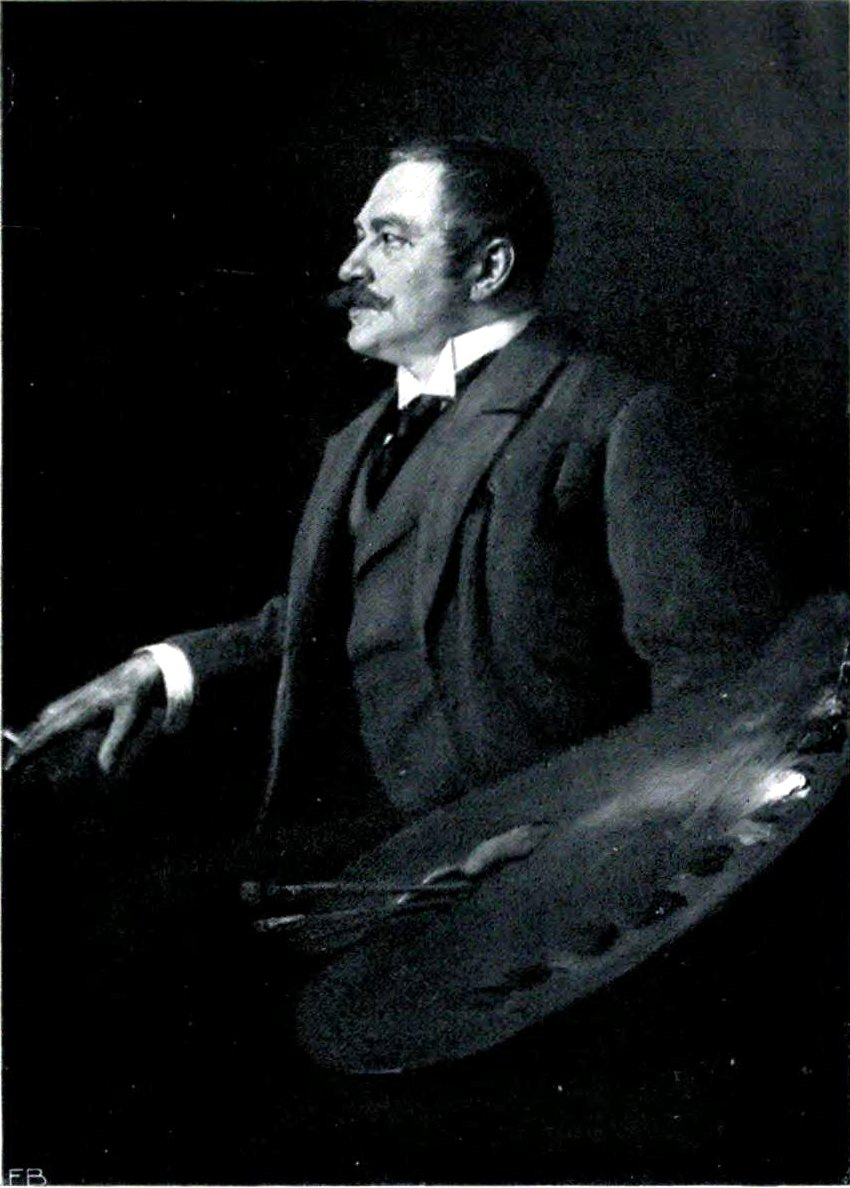
Caspar Ritter; portrait by Otto Propheter (before 1909)

Caspar Ritter (7 February 1861, Esslingen am Neckar – 18 July 1923, Ermatingen) was a Swiss portrait painter; primarily of women. He also created genre scenes and nudes.

== Life and work ==
He was the second of eight children born to Johann Ulrich Ritter, a spinning mill director who was originally from Switzerland. He completed secondary school in Winterthur, where he lived with his grandfather. After graduating, in accordance with his father's wishes, he served an apprenticeship as a machine technician in Flums then, in 1879, went back to Winterthur, where he took a position at the Rieter & Co. textile machine factory. He soon developed health problems, which gave him an opportunity to express his preference for a career in art.

In 1880, on the recommendation of his brother, who was a teacher, he began training as a drawing teacher at the Technikum Winterthur; under the tutelage of Anton Seder and Léon Jean Pétua (1846-1921). Two years later, he was able to transfer to the Academy of Fine Arts, Munich, where he studied with Alois Gabl, Ludwig von Herterich and Ludwig von Löfftz. After completing his studies, he worked for the Academy's pre-school program. That same year, he married Wilhelmine Sophie Linder. As a member of the upper bourgeoisie, she was able to provide him with contacts for portrait commissions.

The following year, they moved to Frankfurt, where he became a teacher of figure painting at the Städel Art Institute. He was there for only a year, when Grand Duke Friedrich I appointed him Professor of portrait painting at the Academy of Fine Arts, Karlsruhe. He would stay there until 1919.

From 1895 to 1900, he held annual showings at the Zürich Artists' Association. In 1896, he was awarded a small gold medal at the Große Berliner Kunstausstellung. His portraits were popular in Germany, but his genre scenes were favored in Switzerland. From 1896 through 1900, he served as a member of the Federal Art Commission, a cultural advisory board for the Swiss Federal Council. In 1902 he was awarded the Medal of Merit, Knight's Cross, in the Order of Berthold the First.

He died of a heart attack while visiting a spa in Ermatingen. His works may be seen at several museums in Germany and Switzerland, including the Kunstmuseum Düsseldorf, Musée Rath, Staatliche Kunsthalle Karlsruhe and the Kunstmuseum Winterthur.

== Selected paintings ==
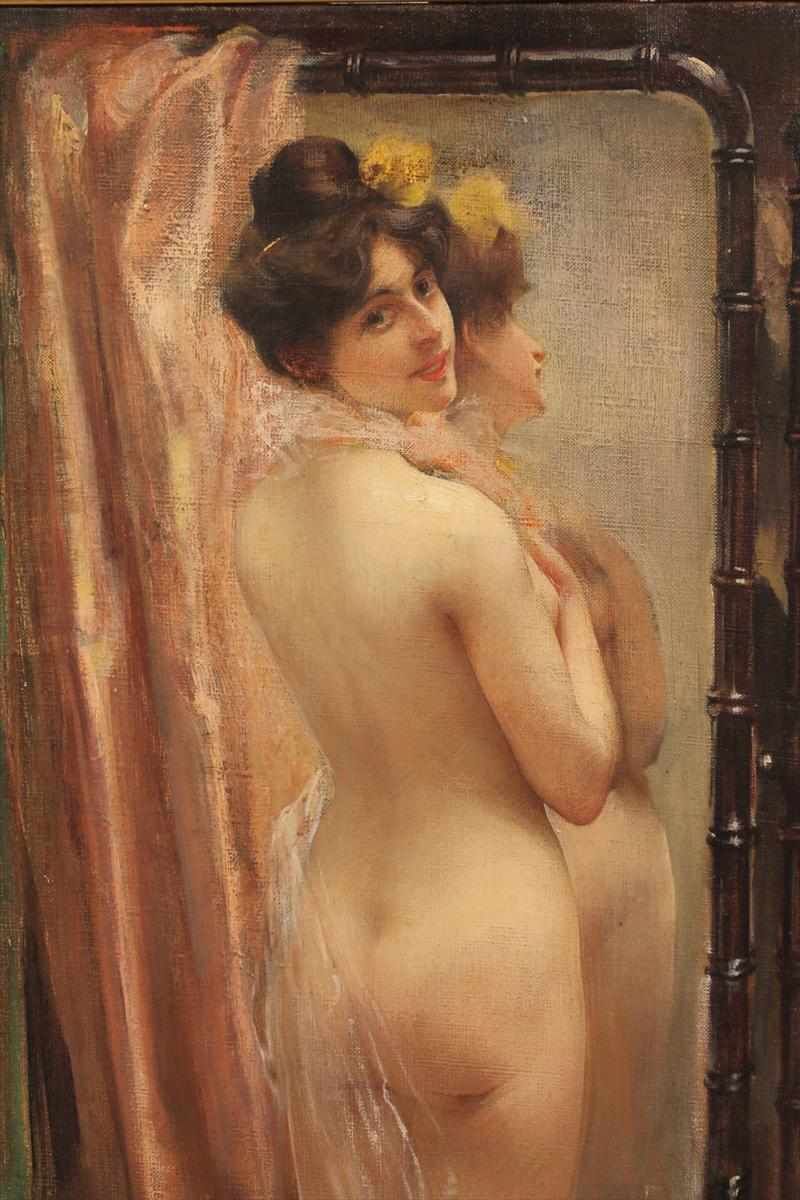
Female Nude

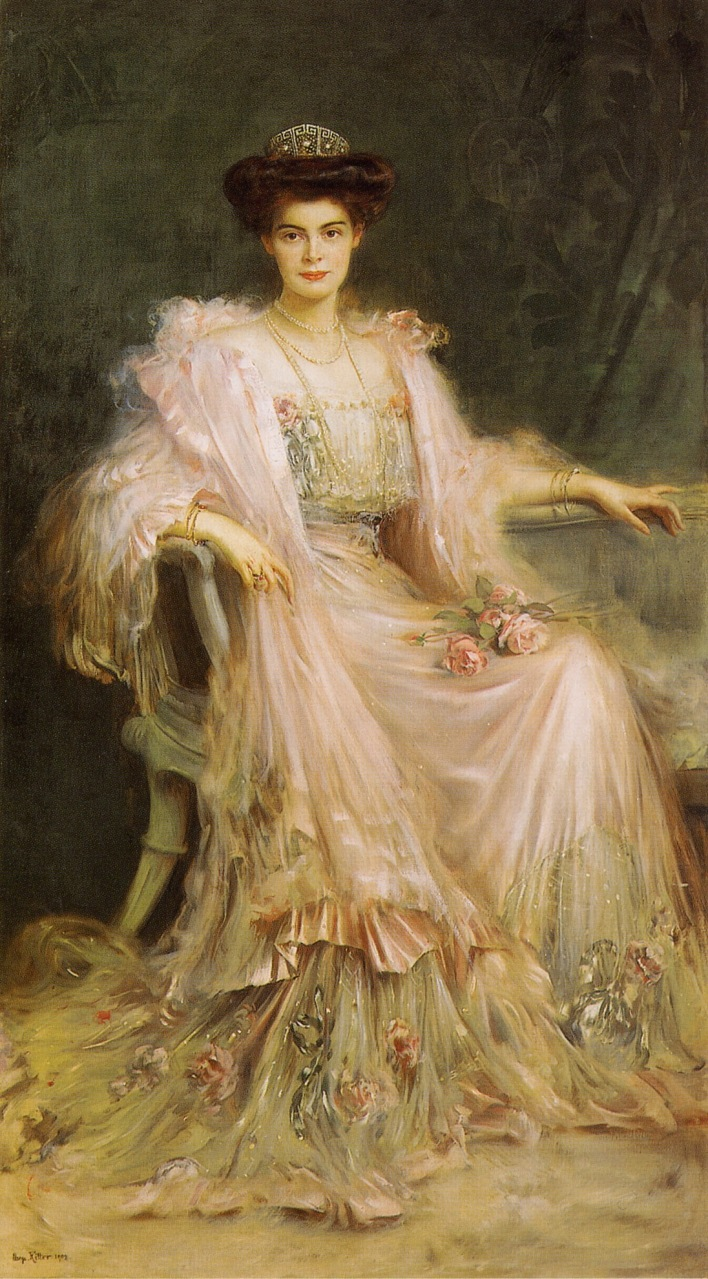
Crown Princess Cecilie of Prussia

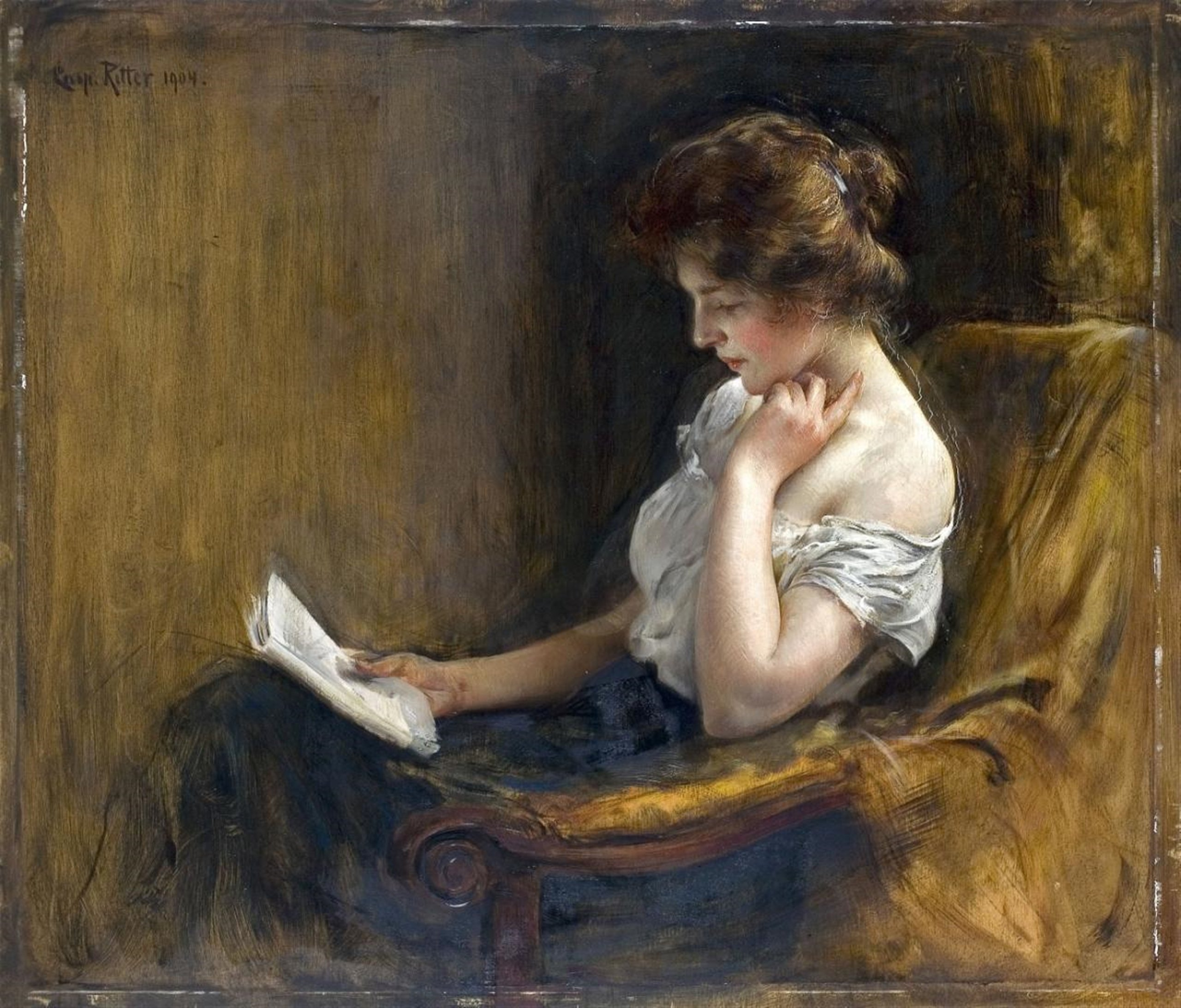
A Young Woman Reading

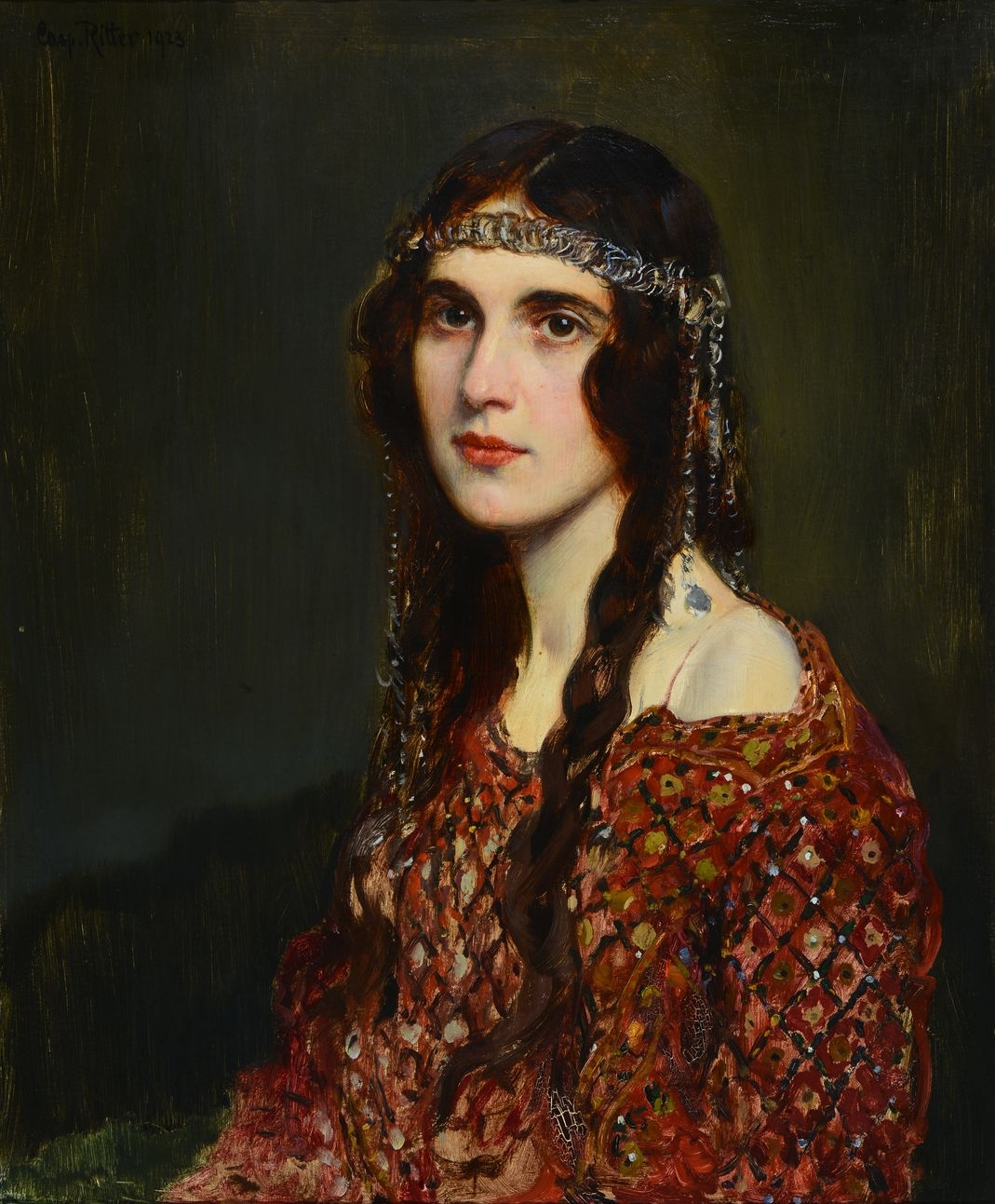
Gypsy Girl

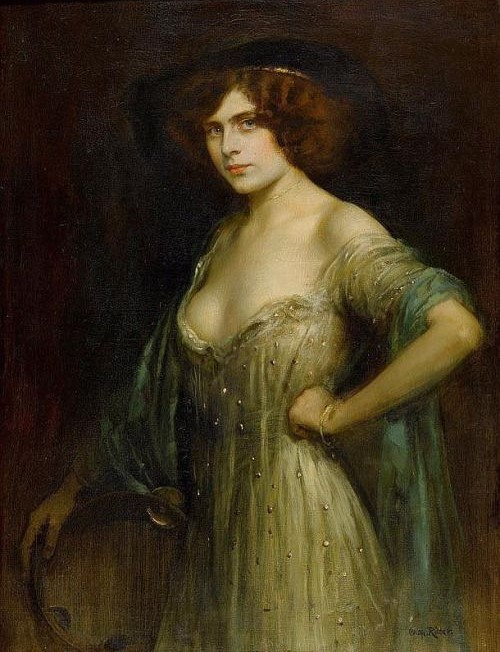
The Tambourine Player

== Sources ==
- "Ritter, Caspar". SIKART Lexicon on art in Switzerland.
- "Ritter, Caspar" in German, French and Italian in the online Historical Dictionary of Switzerland.
- Ritter, Caspar In: Carl Brun: Schweizerisches Künstler-Lexikon. Vol.2, Schweizerischer Kunstverein, Huber, Frauenfeld 1908, pp.635–638 (Online).
- "Caspar Ritter", by Jakob Christoph Heer, from Die Kunst, Vol.19, #24, F. Bruckmann, 1909
