= Engadine (Candler, North Carolina) =

Historic house in North Carolina, United States

- U.S. National Register of Historic Places
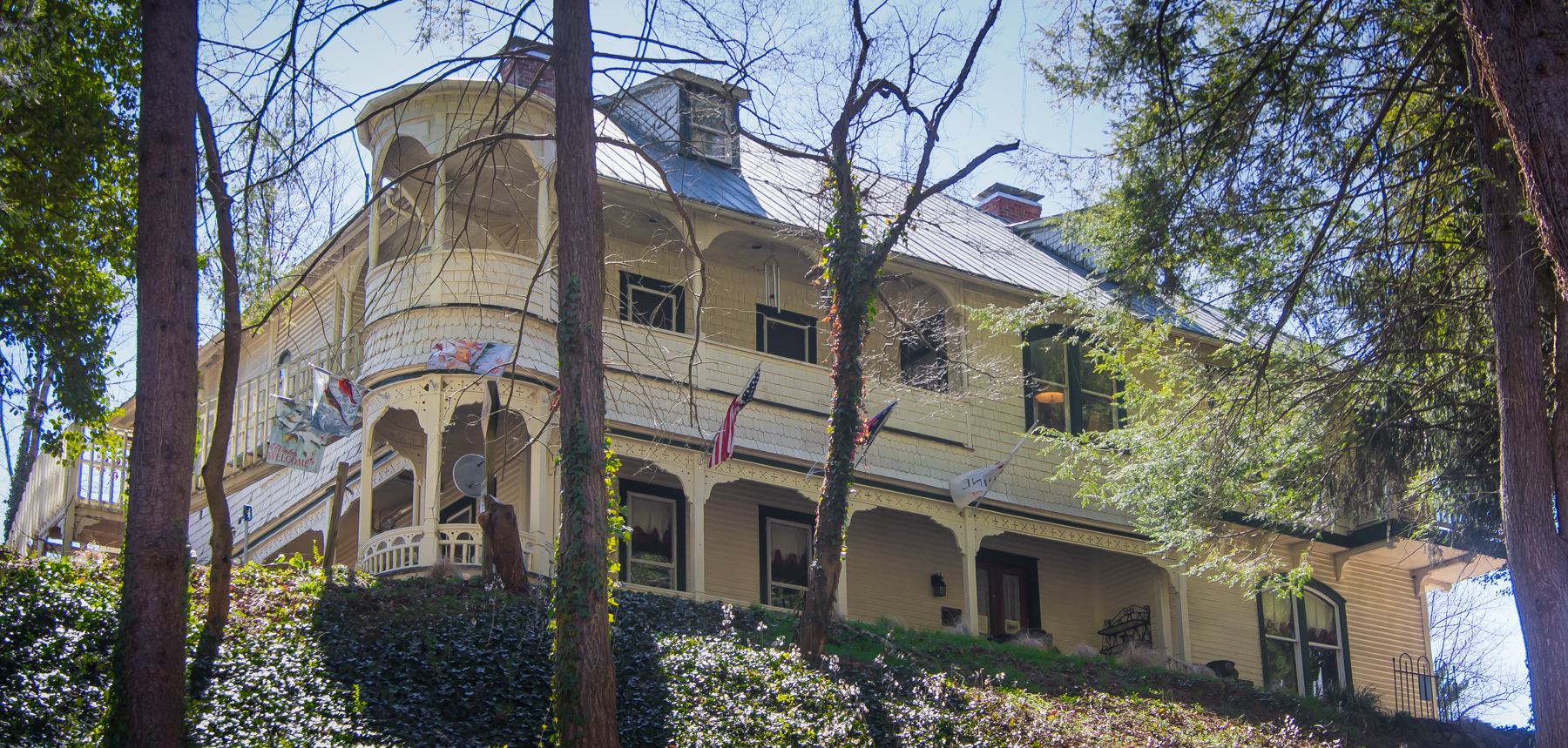

- Location within North Carolina Location within the United States
- Location: US 19/23, 0.3 miles E of Haywood (2630 Smoky Park Highway), near Candler
- Coordinates: 35°32′20″N 82°45′43″W
- Area: 2 acres (0.81 ha)
- Built: 1885
- Architectural style: Queen Anne
- NRHP reference No.: 01001027
- Added to NRHP: September 24, 2001

Engadine, also known as the Captain John K. Hoyt House and Engadine 1885 Inn, is a historic home located near Candler, Buncombe County, North Carolina. It was built in 1885, and is a 2 1/2-story, six-bay, rectangular plan, Queen Anne-style frame dwelling. It is richly decorated and features inset porches, cantilevered corner balcony, and varied shingled and sawnwork decoration. It is currently used as a bed and breakfast inn.

It was listed on the National Register of Historic Places in 2001.
