= Sacred Waters (1960 film) =

1960 film

- Directed by: Alfred Weidenmann
- Screenplay by: Herbert Reinecker
- Starring: Hansjörg Felmy; Cordula Trantow; Hanns Lothar
- Release date: 1960
- Country: Switzerland

Sacred Waters (German: An heiligen Wassern) is a 1960 Swiss drama film directed by Alfred Weidenmann and starring Hansjörg Felmy, Cordula Trantow and Hanns Lothar. It was based on a novel by Jakob Christoph Heer, which had previously been made into a film in 1932.

== Plot ==
The mountain farmers in the remote and arid village of St. Peter in the Swiss canton of Valais rely on the nearby glacier for their water supply. A wooden canal system extends from the glacier to the village. This exposed canal, subject to constant weathering, requires frequent repairs. Since the canal was built along steep cliffs, repair work there is extremely dangerous and has claimed several lives. For this reason, the residents of the (fictional) village refer to the water as "sacred water" with reverence.

Once again, an avalanche destroys the water canal. According to the village's law, the person responsible for the perilous repair is chosen by lottery among all the male villagers. After "Presi" Hans Waldisch, the village president and the wealthiest farmer in the village, pressured the indebted laborer Seppi Blatter to volunteer by promising to forgive all his debts if he stepped forward, Blatter "volunteers" for the repair during a village meeting. He loses his life while working on the steep cliff, and many villagers believe Presi is to blame for Blatter's death. However, Presi had been persuaded by Blatter's wife Fränzi in a private conversation prior to the work and had destroyed the contract that governed the deal between Blatter and Presi without informing the village community. He was convinced that Blatter was the best and most skillful repairman for the canal, so he allowed Blatter to volunteer, believing the contract still existed.

In the following summer, Presi marries a woman from the city who moves to the village with her nephew Thöni Grieg. She immediately opens and renovates the inn operated by Presi to cater to tourists, which is successful in attracting people from all over the world to the village. This leads to prosperity but also disrupts the village's traditional structure. Blatter's son Roman, who is in a relationship with Presi's daughter Binia, leaves St. Peter to work in India for three years. Thöni is Roman's rival and hopes to marry Binia with Presi's blessing. Since Binia is determined to wait for Roman, Thöni intercepts all love letters from Roman as an employee at the local post office and eventually tells Binia that Roman died of cholera in India. At the same time, he writes to Roman, claiming that Binia has married someone else, and his sister Vroni has died.

After three years, Roman returns to St. Peter as an engineer, believing that Binia is married and his sister Vroni is dead. He only intends to visit his parents' and sister's graves in his hometown and then move on. However, things take a different turn as Thöni's schemes are uncovered, and he flees to the mountains. Roman learns that Binia has remained loyal and is still waiting for him. The villagers also become convinced that Roman is sincere about his feelings for Binia.

As a mining engineer, Roman is now capable of blasting a tunnel through solid rock. He offers to build a new water pipeline for the village, one that can withstand avalanches. When the old wooden pipeline is once again damaged by an avalanche, he takes charge of constructing a tunnel pipeline. While Roman is hanging from a rope on the cliff after completing the work, Thöni attempts to murder him by cutting the rope with an axe. Roman manages to save himself at the last moment, and the construction work is completed. Presi, who had long considered Roman a troublemaker and good-for-nothing, now acknowledges him as a capable and reliable young man. Consequently, he gives his consent for Roman to marry Binia.

The village's water supply is now permanently secure. The film concludes with a reverent gesture from the villagers towards the perpetually flowing sacred water.

== Production ==
=== Accuracy to the novel ===
The film largely follows the 1898 novel of the same name, but deviates significantly from it at the end. The rights to it were initially acquired by film producer Erwin C. Dietrich. After Dietrich had only limited success with his production The King of Bernina, also based on a Heer novel, he sold the option for Sacred Waters to his competitor Henrik Kaestlin of the Zurich-based Cine Custodia.

=== Production ===
Rolf Zehetbauer, Max Röthlisberger, and Heinrich Weidemann were responsible for the sets. Mountain guide Alfons Supersaxo provided technical advice for the mountain scenes. The film features the song "Les Rogations", sung by La Chanson du Rhône. and composed by Jean Daetwyler.

Swiss producer Kaestlin was able to secure five German Federal Film Award winners for the film: Alfred Weidenmann, Herbert Reinecker, Hans-Martin Majewski, Hanns Lothar, and Cordula Trantow. The screenplay adaptation was done by Herbert Reinecker. He later became known for being a writer for the TV series Der Kommissar and Derrick.

The film was shot in Evolène and Saas-Fee in the Canton of Valais with the support of the authorities,

=== Release ===
The film premiered simultaneously in the Federal Republic of Germany and in Switzerland on December 23, 1960. In the US, the film was released in 1962 under the title Sacred Waters. In Belgium, it was released under the French title De l'eau au prix de leur sang. In France, it was released under the titles Les eaux saintes and Les eaux saintes du valais.

The film was released on DVD on October 27, 2005, by e-m-s GmbH as part of the series "Filmpalast – Yesterday's Cinema Hits. Unforgotten Stars and Their Films." Lichtspielhaus also released the film on DVD on November 26, 2009.

== Cast ==
- Hansjörg Felmy as Roman Blatter
- Cordula Trantow as Binja
- Hanns Lothar as Thöni Grieg
- Karl John as Seppi Blatter, Romans Vater
- Gustav Knuth as Der Presi, Hans Waldisch, Wirt zum Bären
- Gisela von Collande as Fränzi Blatter, Romans Mutter
- Margrit Rainer as Creszenz Waldisch, die Bärenwirtin
- Leopold Biberti as Der Garde, Hans Zuensteinen
- Uta Kohlhoff as Vroni Blatter, Roman Blatters Schwester
- Hans Hessling as Bälzi
- Walter Ladengast as Kaplan Johannes
- Fritz Schulz as Der Dorfpfarrer
- Jean Bruno as Thugi
- John Bentley as Lemmy, ein Engländer
- Schaggi Streuli as Landrat
