= The King of Bernina =

1957 film

- .
- Directed by: Alfred Lehner
- Written by: Karl Heinz Busse; Jakob Christoph Heer
- Based on: Der König der Bernina by Jakob Christoph Heer
- Produced by: Erwin C. Dietrich; Hans Engel
- Starring: Helmuth Schneider; Waltraut Haas; Walter Janssen
- Cinematography: Sepp Ketterer
- Edited by: Margarete Egle
- Music by: Frank Filip
- Production companies: Urania Film; Zenith-Sonor Produktion
- Distributed by: Europa-Filmverleih (W.Germany)
- Release date: 9 August 1957
- Running time: 93 minutes
- Countries: Austria; Switzerland
- Language: German

The King of Bernina (German: Der König der Bernina) is a 1957 Austrian-Swiss historical drama film directed by Alfred Lehner and starring Helmuth Schneider, Waltraut Haas and Walter Janssen.

The film's sets were designed by the art director Nino Borghi. It was shot at the Rosenhügel Studios in Vienna. Location shooting took place in the Swiss Alps. The film was made using Agfacolor. It was based on a classic novel which had previously been filmed in Hollywood as Eternal Love (1929) by Ernst Lubitsch.

Set during the Napoleonic era, it is part of the heimatfilm tradition of the post-war years. It is also a re-envisioning of the mountain film genre.

== Plot ==
The film is set in the Napoleonic era at the beginning of the 19th century. After three years in a remote monastery, Cilgia and Monika return to the French-occupied Engadine. Cilgia is the niece of the village priest. On their way to the village, they meet Markus Paltram (based on the life of Gian Marchet Colani), who once lived there. His father was the village blacksmith but left when he was thought to be a murderer after an accident on the mountain. He died of grief far away. His son now returns to the village as an adult. He wants to work as a gunsmith or blacksmith. In the village, however, he is met with suspicion and rejection. The boastful Seni in particular makes his life difficult. Seni also has his eye on the beautiful gypsy daughter Pia. Her family is leaving the village. Halfway there, they find the seriously injured Siegesmund Gruber, the son of a wealthy landowner. He was hunted and almost shot by the French. Pia and Markus bring Siegesmund across the border into Austria. Seni wants to bring Markus to justice, fearing French revenge. Only when it becomes clear that Siegesmund is the one who was rescued do the men in the village calm down.

A short time later, it is announced that the Engadin is free and Napoleon has withdrawn. A shooting festival is held to celebrate, and Markus wins. He dances his victory dance with Cilgia, whom he loves, and is mocked by Seni and his men. When he returns to his place, his rifle is missing. It turns out that the gypsies stole it. Pia, however, secretly steals her father's rifle and returns it to Markus, whom she intends to seduce. Since Markus is not at home, she looks for him on the mountain. While trying to attract his attention, Pia falls. Markus takes her into his house and nurses her back to health. Siegesmund, too, is now healthy and visits Cilgia. He has fallen in love with her and wants to marry her, but Cilgia rejects him. She loves Markus. Markus, however, is jealous and believes Cilgia prefers the rich Siegesmund, especially since Markus only wants to marry her once he has cleared his name in the village. Among other things, he campaigns for a ban on hunting in the Bernina region—another reason why Seni wants to drive Markus out of the area, since hunting has always been free.

Siegesmund throws a thanksgiving feast for his rescuers, Cilgia and Markus, at which he gives Cilgia a necklace. Markus, however, jealously stays away from the feast, eventually arrives drunk, and insults Siegesmund. He is sent away by Cilgia and returns to his hut in frustration. Pia seizes her opportunity and seduces the drunken Markus. Some time later, Markus orders the banns from the village priest because Pia is pregnant. She dies giving birth to her daughter, who is also named Pia in memory of her mother. Pia's death has driven Markus from the village. He now lives in the mountains, rescues people who have had accidents on the mountain, and cares for the wild animals. At the Estates Assembly, he once again submitted a proposal to close the Bernina to hunting; an initial proposal was rejected. Markus's services to the people become known beyond the Bernina, and the district administrator's son, Konrad, writes the song "King of the Bernina" about Markus, which soon becomes the talk of the town.

Two years have passed since Pia's death. Her daughter is growing up with the priest. Siegesmund, in turn, has courted Cilgia, who now works as a housekeeper on his farm, but to no avail. Cilgia, however, cannot forget Markus; a box he created for Father Gruber reminds her of him daily. After Siegesmund tried to take Cilgia by force and his father prevented this, Siegesmund takes the box and goes to the village. From Seni, he learns the way to the hunting-free area guarded by Markus. Once there, he shoots into the air and waits for Markus. He wants to kill him, but Markus manages to scare Siegesmund away. On the way down, Siegesmund falls from the mountain. Markus carries him back to the village, and the villagers believe Siegesmund to be dead. The district administrator arrests Markus for murder, but Siegesmund survives and takes the blame. He is dismayed to realize that Markus has saved his life for the second time. A short time later, Konrad is elected as the new district administrator and, as his first official act, announces that the Estates Council has declared the Bernina Mountains a nature reserve, prohibiting hunting in the future. There is a happy ending, and the reconciled Markus will now start a family with Pia and Cilgia.

== Cast ==
- Helmuth Schneider as Markus
- Waltraut Haas as Cilgia Tass
- Walter Janssen as Prister Tass
- Heinrich Gretler as Landrat
- Franz Messner as Konrad
- Erich Dörner as Golci Zigeuner
- Ellen Schwiers as Pia
- Leopold Esterle as Dreschner Kaufmann
- Inge Konradi as Monika
- Sepp Rist as Vater Gruber
- Erich Auer as Siegesmund Gruber
- Walter Stummvoll as Haffner Dorfwirt
- Helmut Schmid as Seni
- Jenny Rausnitz as Magd-Margret

== Bibliography ==
- Von Dassanowsky, Robert (2005). Austrian Cinema: A History. McFarland. ISBN 978-1-4766-2147-0.
