= Engadine =

Engadine may refer to:

== Places ==
- Engadin, a valley region in Switzerland
- Engadine, New South Wales, a suburb of Sydney, Australia
- Engadine, Michigan, unincorporated community in Michigan
- Engadine (Candler, North Carolina), a building listed on the National Register of Historic Places

== Ships ==
- SS Engadine, a passenger ferry
- HMS Engadine (1911), a seaplane tender
- HMS Engadine (1941), an aircraft transporter
- RFA Engadine (K08), a helicopter support ship

== Other ==
- Engadine sheep, a breed of sheep from Switzerland, also known as Red Engadine
