= Jakob Christoph Heer =

Swiss writer (1859–1925)

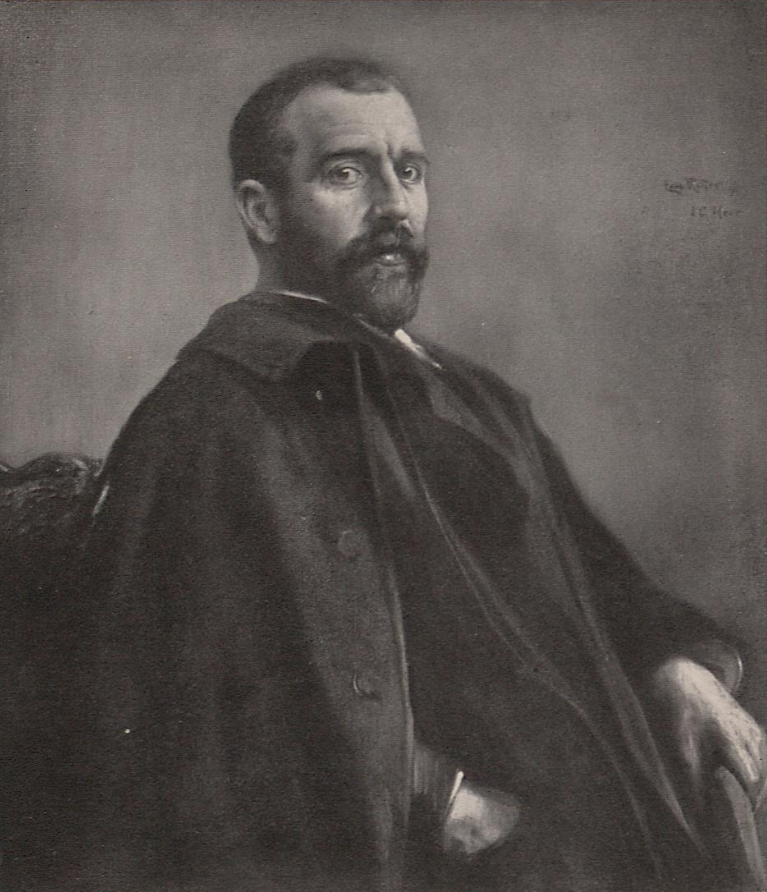
Jakob Christoph Heer, portrait by Caspar Ritter (c. 1909)

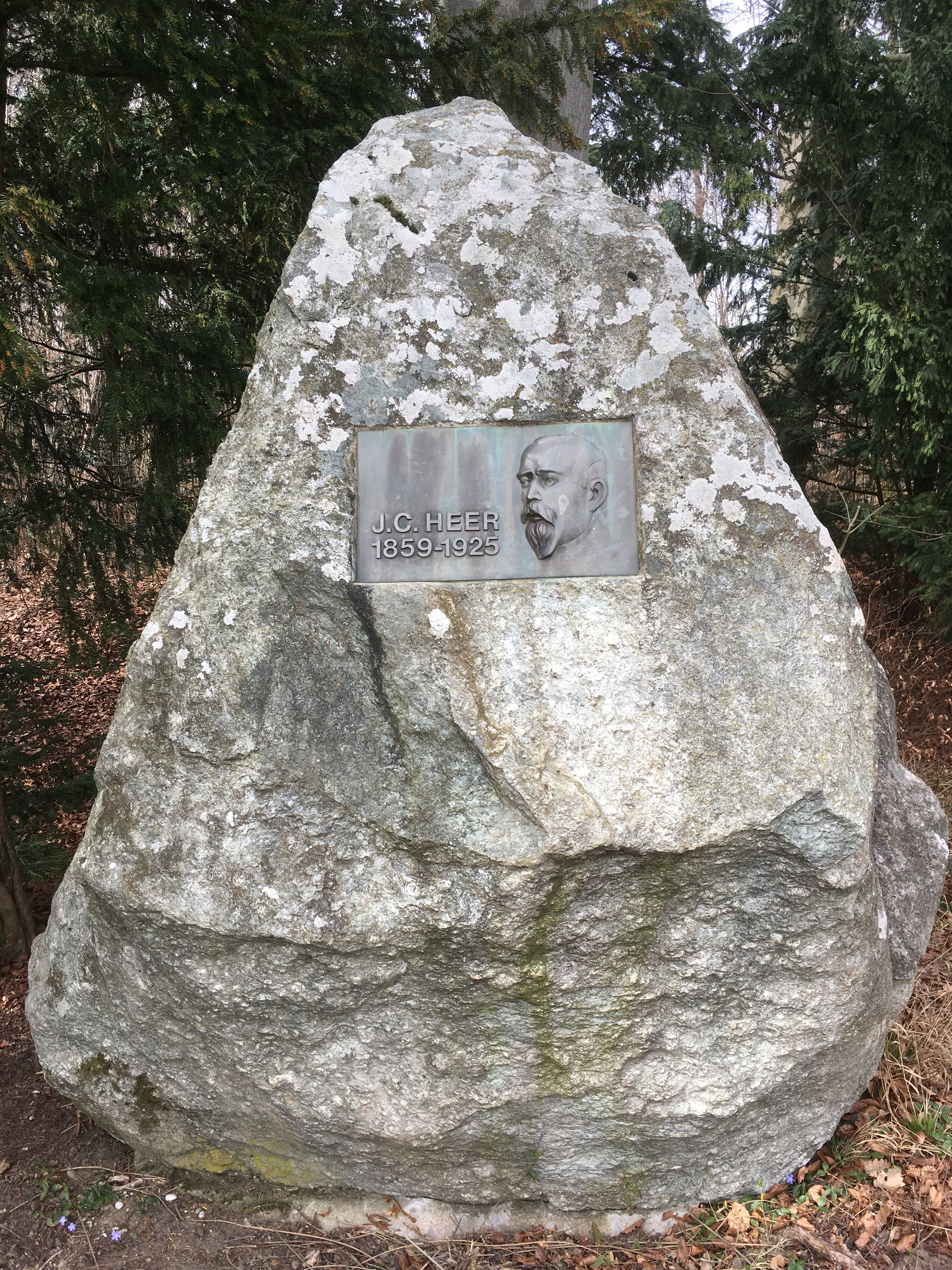
His commemorative stone in Winterthur

Jakob Christoph Heer (17 July 1859, Winterthur – 20 August 1925, Zürich) was a Swiss novelist and travel writer.

== Life and career ==
His father, Christoph (1833-1913), was a fitter who served in the Winterthur city government. In 1879, he was awarded a teaching certificate from the Kantonsschule Küsnacht. He originally worked as a "vicar" (substitute teacher) in Glattfelden then, in 1882, found a permanent position in Dürnten. His first book, Holidays on the Adriatic, was published in 1888. He became the features editor for the Neue Zürcher Zeitung in 1892. The following year, he married Emma Karoline Gossweiler (1859-1936), daughter of Adolf Gossweiler, an engineer. From 1899 to 1902, he was an editor for Die Gartenlaube. After 1902, he worked as a freelance writer.

== Works ==
Heer's novels include:

- 1898, An heiligen Wassern
- 1900, Der König der Bernina
- 1901, Felix Notvest
- 1902, Joggeli
- 1905, Der Wetterwart
- 1908, Laubgewind
- 1918, Heinrichs Romfahrt
- 1920, Nick Tappoli
- 1922, Tobias Heider

== Adaptations ==
His two best known novels have each been adapted into movies twice.

Der König der Bernina (The King of Bernina) was originally filmed in the United States in 1929 (directed by Ernst Lubitsch and starring John Barrymore), under the title Eternal Love. It was filmed again in 1957 (Der König der Bernina) by a Swiss-Austrian coproduction company, and directed by Alfred Lehner.

An heiligen Wassern (On Holy Waters) was filmed in Germany in 1932 by Erich Waschneck, under the title Stürzende Wasser (Sacred Water), and again in 1960 by the Swiss director, Alfred Weidenmann (An Heiligen Wassern).

== Memorials ==
On a hill in Winterthur, there is a "Gedenkstein" (commemorative stone), donated by the city of Poschiavo. In Der König der Bernina the main character, Markus Paltram, is inspired by a hunter and gunsmith named Gian Marchet Colani, who was from that area. Heer is buried nearby. He had originally wanted to be buried in another location closer to town but, by the time he died, a slaughterhouse was being built near there.

A second stone was placed in Pontresina, on a spot with a view of the Piz Bernina.
