= Sacred Waters (1932 film) =

1932 film

- Directed by: Erich Waschneck
- Written by: Jakob Christoph Heer (novel); Paul Altheer; Erich Waschneck; Franz Winterstein
- Produced by: Erich Waschneck
- Starring: Karin Hardt; Eduard von Winterstein; Hans Adalbert Schlettow; Carl Balhaus
- Cinematography: Franz Koch
- Music by: Wolfgang Zeller
- Production company: Fanal-Filmproduktion
- Distributed by: Terra Film
- Release date: 13 December 1932
- Running time: 84 minutes
- Country: Germany
- Language: German

Sacred Waters (German: An heiligen Wassern or Stürzende Wasser) is a 1932 German drama film directed by Erich Waschneck and starring Karin Hardt, Eduard von Winterstein and Hans Adalbert Schlettow. It was shot at the Tempelhof Studios in Berlin with sets designed by the art director Hans Jacoby. It is part of the heimatfilm genre. The film was based on a novel by Jakob Christoph Heer, which was later adapted into a 1960 Swiss film.

== Cast ==
- Karin Hardt as Sabine Waldisch
- Eduard von Winterstein as Peter Waldisch
- Hans Adalbert Schlettow as Sepp Blattrer
- Carl Balhaus as Josi Blattrer
- Theodor Loos as Landowner
- Reinhold Bernt as Töni
- Peter Erkelenz as Engineer
- Martha Ziegler as Fränzi Blattrer
- Erika Dannhoff as Vroni Blattrer
- Hans Henninger as Franz
- Otto Kronburger as Water Technician
- Elisabeth Wendt
- Dorothea Thiess
- Klaus Pohl
- Clemens Hasse
- Willi Schur
- Eugen Rex
- Gustav Rickelt

== Bibliography ==
- Bergfelder, Tim & Bock, Hans-Michael. The Concise Cinegraph: Encyclopedia of German. Berghahn Books, 2009.
- Klaus, Ulrich J. Deutsche Tonfilme: Jahrgang 1932. Klaus-Archiv, 1988.
