= Fraubrunnen District =

Coordinates: 47.1°N 7.5°E

Fraubrunnen District Amtsbezirk Fraubrunnen
- District
- Flag Coat of arms

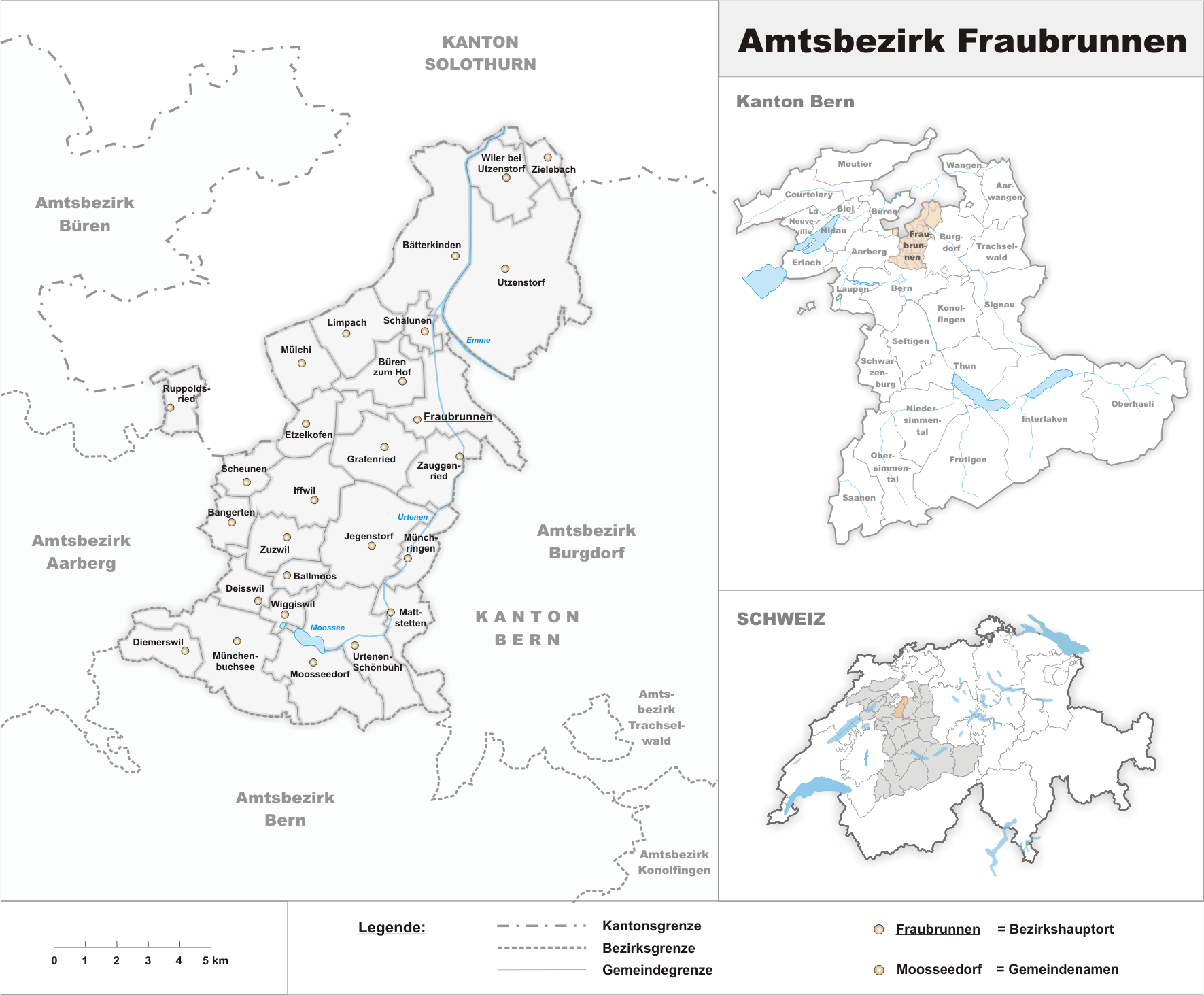
- Country: Switzerland
- Canton: Bern
- Capital: Fraubrunnen

Area
  - Total: 124 km^{2} (48 sq mi)

Population (2007)
  - Total: 38,895
  - Density: 314/km^{2} (812/sq mi)
- Time zone: UTC+1 (CET)
  - Summer (DST): UTC+2 (CEST)
- Municipalities: 26

Fraubrunnen District is a constitutional district along of the 26 districts in the canton of Bern, Switzerland. Its capital is the municipality of Fraubrunnen. The district has an area of 124 km² and consisted of 27 municipalities.

From 1 January 2010, the district lost its administrative power while being replaced by the Emmental district, whose administrative centre is Langnau im Emmental. Since 2010, it remains a fully recognised district under the law and the Constitution (Art.3 al.2) of the Canton of Berne.

Municipality	Population (Jan 2005)	Area (km²)
Bangerten	163	2.2
Bätterkinden	2,780	10.1
Büren zum Hof	455	3.5
Deisswil bei Münchenbuchsee	80	2.1
Diemerswil	185	2.8
Etzelkofen	350	2.8
Fraubrunnen	1,691	7.7
Grafenried	912	4.7
Iffwil	399	5.0
Jegenstorf	4,508^{a}	8.9
Limpach	327	4.4
Mattstetten	565	3.8
Moosseedorf	3,437	6.3
Mülchi	250	3.8
Münchenbuchsee	9,519	8.9
Münchringen	544	2.4
Ruppoldsried	256	2.2
Schalunen	378	1.4
Scheunen	71	2.
Urtenen-Schönbühl	5,337	7.2
Utzenstorf	3,763	17.0
Wiggiswil	95	1.4
Wiler bei Utzenstorf	794	3.8
Zauggenried	314	3.7
Zielebach	337	1.9
Zuzwil	504	3.5

^a Population is as of December 2007, includes population and area of Ballmoos which merged into Jegenstorf in 2010
