= Deisswil =

Deisswil may refer to:

in the Canton of Berne, Switzerland:

- Deisswil bei Münchenbuchsee, a municipality
- Deisswil bei Stettlen, a village part of Stettlen
