= Bremgarten bei Bern =

- Municipality
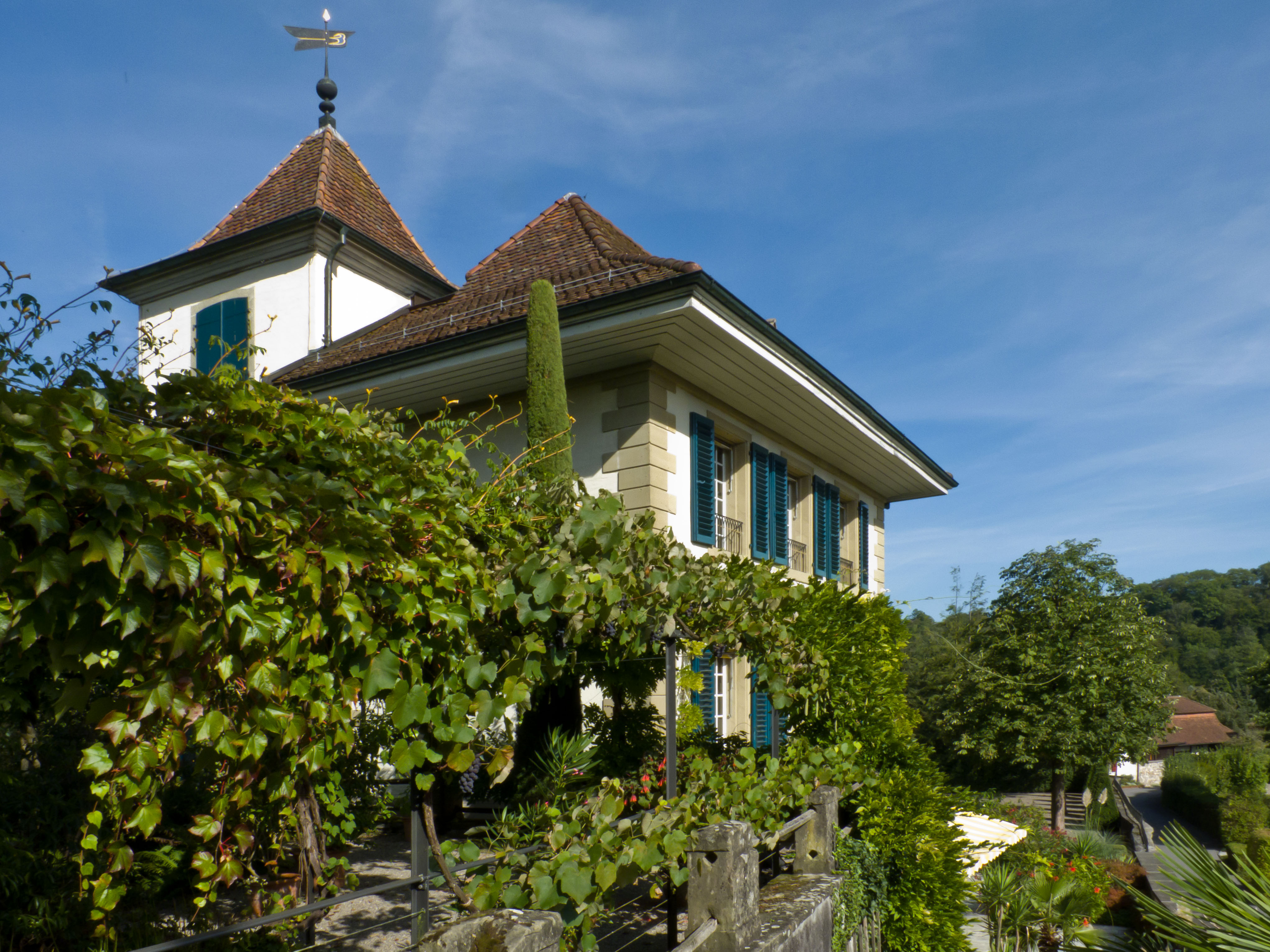

- Flag Coat of arms
- Location of Bremgarten bei Bern
- Location within Switzerland Location within Canton of Bern
- Coordinates: 46°58′N 7°26′E
- Country: Switzerland
- Canton: Bern
- District: Bern-Mittelland

Government
  - Executive: Gemeinderat with 7 members
  - Mayor: Gemeindepräsident; Andreas Schwab SPS/PSS (as of 2026)

Area
  - Total: 1.90 km^{2} (0.73 sq mi)
- Elevation: 490 m (1,610 ft)
- Highest elevation (Birchiwald): 589 m (1,932 ft)
- Lowest elevation (Schlosshalbinsel): 488 m (1,601 ft)

Population (December 2020)
  - Total: 4,340
  - Density: 2,280/km^{2} (5,920/sq mi)
- Time zone: UTC+01:00 (CET)
  - Summer (DST): UTC+02:00 (CEST)
- Postal code: 3047
- SFOS number: 353
- ISO 3166 code: CH-BE
- Surrounded by: Bern, Kirchlindach, Zollikofen
- Website: bremgarten-be.ch

Bremgarten bei Bern is a municipality in the Bern-Mittelland administrative district in the canton of Bern in Switzerland.

== History ==
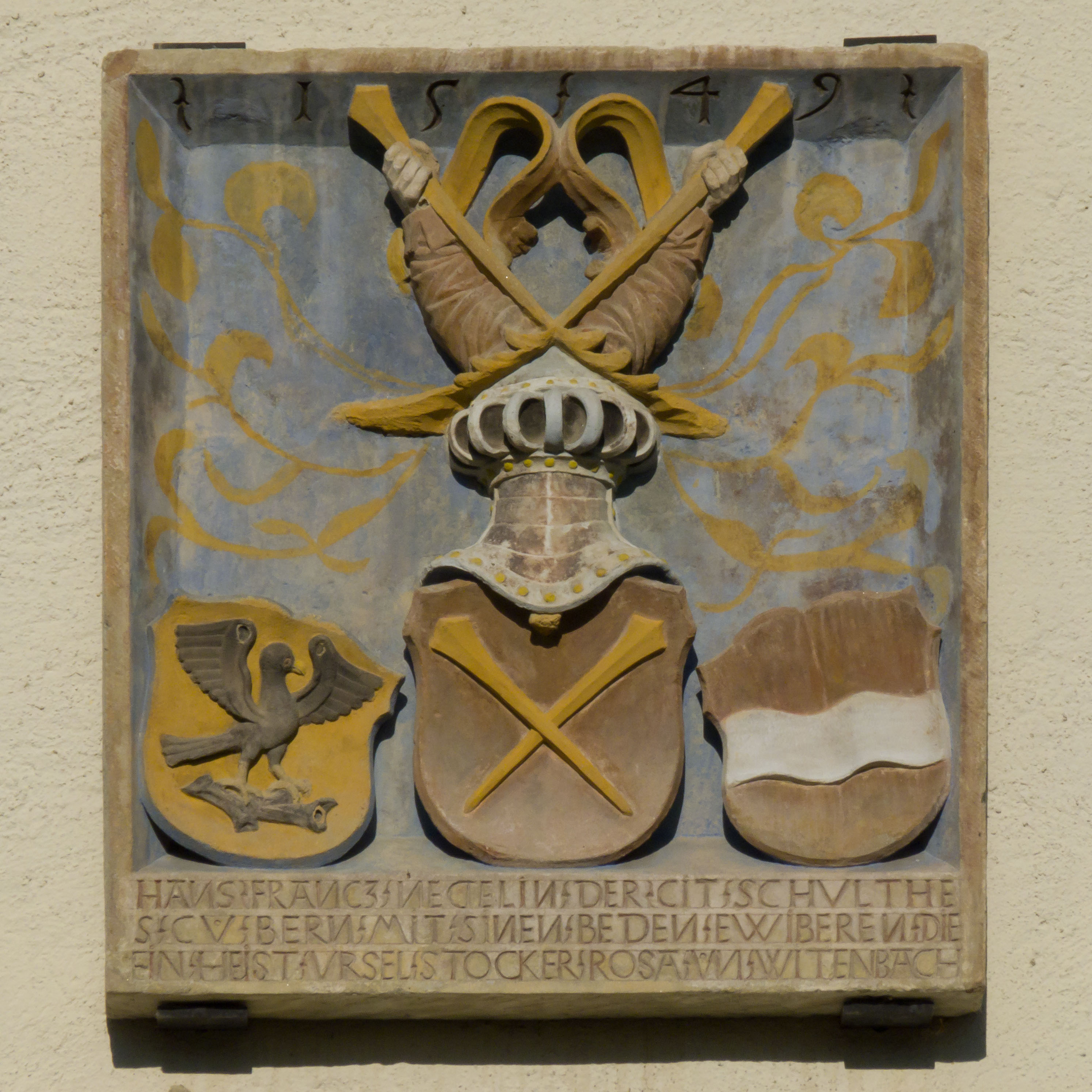
Coats of Arms of Schultheissen Hans-Franz Nägeli (1497-1579) and his two wives Ursel Stocker and Rosa von Witenbach on Bremgarten Castle

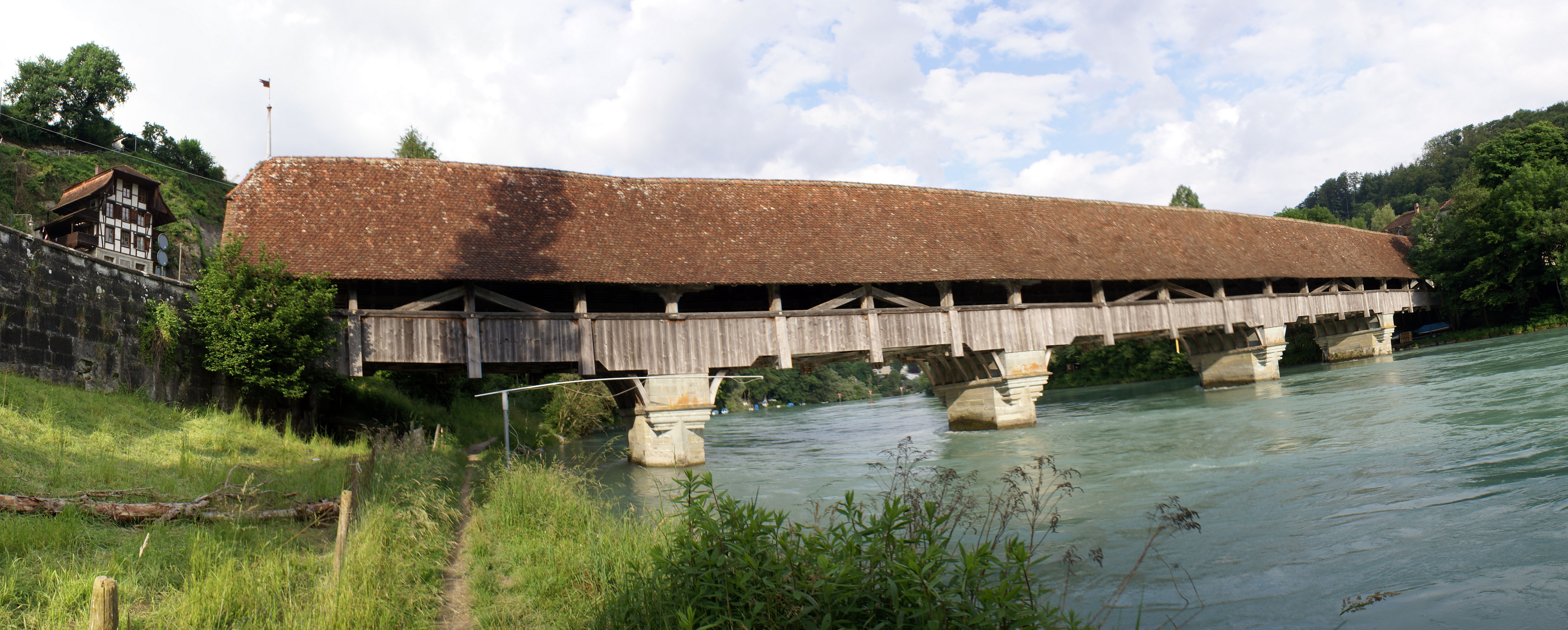
The Neubrügg was built in 1466 to replace a ferry over the Aare at Bremgarten

Bremgarten bei Bern is first mentioned in 1180 as Bremecart. In 1236 it was mentioned as Bremegarten and until 1870 it was known as Bremgarten-Herrschaft.

The oldest trace of settlements in Bremgarten are from the Roman era and include a settlement, cobbled roads and Roman coins. During the Middle Ages there was a castle and village at Bremgarten, though no trace remains. However, in 1978, the outer curtain wall of the old castle was discovered. The castle, the home of the Lords of Bremgarten, was located at a narrow point on the Aare peninsula. The castle was the center of a barony that stretched along the Aare river at least as far as from Worblaufen to Kirchlindach. The Bremgarten family's personal church, St. Michaels Church was first mentioned in 1275, though it was built in the 10th or 11th century and the choir was rebuilt in 1306.

In 1298, the town and castle were destroyed by Bern after the Bernese victory at the Battle of Donnerbühl. In 1306, the Lords of Bremgarten sold their land, rights and their ferry, to the Knights Hospitaller commandry of Münchenbuchsee. Under the Commandery, the town and castle were rebuilt and the castle became the seat of the commander. In 1510 the lands in Bremgarten were sold to the Stuckihaus Commandery to hold as a fief. Following the Protestant Reformation, the Commandery was secularized in 1529 and its land became part of Bern. The last commander of Münchenbuchsee Commandry retired to Bremgarten Castle for the remainder of his life. Bremgarten was assigned to the high court of Zollikofen. Much of the land that had been part of the Barony of Bremgarten was broken up to form new municipalities. In 1545, Bern sold the village and low court right to the Schultheiss Hans Franz Nageli. He demolished the old castle, except for the keep and curtain walls, and had a renaissance country manor built. Over the following centuries the castle and land was repeatedly inherited, bought and sold by Bern's patrician families. It was held in 1579-92 by the Brügger family, 1592-1727 by the Kilchberger, 1727-43 by the de Chemilleret, 1743-61 by the von Wattenwyl and in 1761-65 by Fischer von Reichenbach. In 1743-47 the medieval keep and ramparts of the castle were demolished to make way for a baroque summer palace. Starting in 1765, the new owner Albrecht von Frisching, encouraged many tenants and craftsmen to settle in Bremgarten to help him rebuild the castle. By 1780 the project was finished and the castle was completely rebuilt. He had the castle hill built up and leveled to create a spacious courtyard and gardens around the castle. In 1770-71 the country estates of Belvedere (Friedrich von Luternau) and Aarwyl (Rudolf Albrecht Haller) were built in Bremgarten.

During the 19th century, Bremgarten Castle changed hands frequently, until 1918 when it was bought by the wealthy industrialist Wassmer family. They repaired the castle and in 1978 fully restored it.

After the 1798 French invasion and under the Helvetic Republic, Bremgarten was granted a town council and became part of the District of Bern. The first bridge over the Aare at Bremgarten was the Neubrügg which was built in 1466. However, the town remained isolated from the major roads leading to Bern until the 20th century. In 1921, the much larger Seftausteg bridge was built next to the Neubrügg. This was followed in 1928 by the Felsenaubrücke which was built by the army as a wooden bridge in 1929 and rebuilt as a solid-web girder bridge made of packed concrete in 1949.

The town was chronically short of money and sought to be incorporated into Bern in 1925, 1934 and 1945. A building boom in the 1950s helped alleviate many of the town's financial problems. With little industrial development, Bremgarten has remained a bedroom community of Bern with over 80% of the working population commuting to Bern.

== Geography ==
Bremgarten bei Bern has an area of 1.9 km^{2} (0.73 sq mi). Of this area, 0.61 km^{2} (0.24 mi^{2}) or 31.9% is used for agricultural purposes, while 0.31 km^{2} (0.12 mi^{2}) or 16.2% is forested. Of the rest of the land, 0.87 km^{2} (0.34 mi^{2}) or 45.5% is settled (buildings or roads), 0.08 km^{2} (20 acres) or 4.2% is either rivers or lakes and 0.01 km^{2} (2.5 acres) or 0.5% is unproductive land.

Of the built up area, housing and buildings made up 35.1%, transportation infrastructure made up 7.3% and parks, green belts and sports fields made up 2.1%. Out of the forested land, 12.6% of the total land area is heavily forested and 3.7% is covered with orchards or small clusters of trees. Of the agricultural land, 21.5% is used for growing crops and 8.9% is pastures, while 1.6% is used for orchards or vine crops. All the water in the municipality is flowing water.

The municipality is located in the agglomeration of Bern on the right bank of the Aare river. It consists of the village of Bremgarten bei Bern and the neighborhoods of Seftau-Ländli, Äschenbrunnmatt, Kalchacker, Stuckishaus-Neubrügg and Bündacker.

On 31 December 2009 Amtsbezirk Bern, the municipality's former district, was dissolved. On the following day, 1 January 2010, it joined the newly created Verwaltungskreis Bern-Mittelland.

== Coat of arms ==
The blazon of the municipal coat of arms is Per fess pally of six Argent and Sable and barry of six of the same.

== Demographics ==
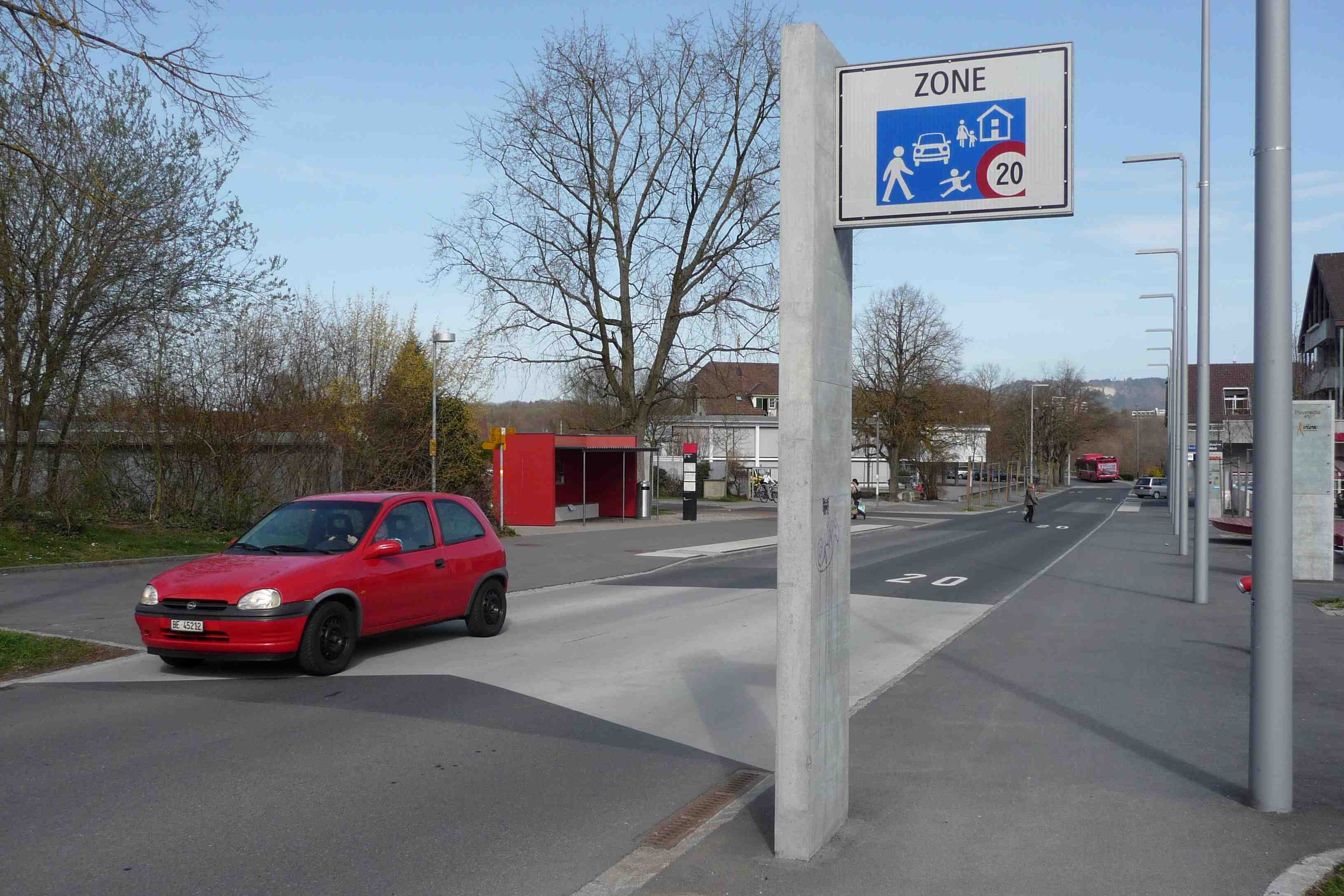
Kalchacherstrasse in Bremgarten

Bremgarten bei Bern has a population (as of December 2020) of 4,340. As of 2010, 8.8% of the population are resident foreign nationals. Over the last 10 years (2000-2010) the population has changed at a rate of 10.9%. Migration accounted for 10.5%, while births and deaths accounted for 0.6%.

Most of the population (as of 2000) speaks German (3,508 or 92.3%) as their first language, French is the second most common (75 or 2.0%) and Italian is the third (41 or 1.1%). There is 1 person who speaks Romansh.

As of 2008, the population was 47.2% male and 52.8% female. The population was made up of 1,788 Swiss men (42.6% of the population) and 193 (4.6%) non-Swiss men. There were 2,035 Swiss women (48.5%) and 177 (4.2%) non-Swiss women. Of the population in the municipality, 622 or about 16.4% were born in Bremgarten bei Bern and lived there in 2000. There were 1,836 or 48.3% who were born in the same canton, while 777 or 20.4% were born somewhere else in Switzerland, and 461 or 12.1% were born outside of Switzerland.

As of 2010, children and teenagers (0–19 years old) make up 20.3% of the population, while adults (20–64 years old) make up 58.6% and seniors (over 64 years old) make up 21.1%.

As of 2000, there were 1,382 people who were single and never married in the municipality. There were 2,031 married individuals, 206 widows or widowers and 183 individuals who are divorced.

As of 2000, there were 427 households that consist of only one person and 85 households with five or more people. In 2000, a total of 1,572 apartments (94.0% of the total) were permanently occupied, while 80 apartments (4.8%) were seasonally occupied and 20 apartments (1.2%) were empty. As of 2010, the construction rate of new housing units was 4.1 new units per 1000 residents. The vacancy rate for the municipality, in 2011, was 1.76%.

The historical population is given in the following chart:

== Heritage sites of national significance ==
The Castle is listed as a Swiss heritage site of national significance. The region around Bremgarten is part of the Inventory of Swiss Heritage Sites.

During the Protestant Reformation in 1528, the last Commander of the Knights Hospitaller's Münchenbuchsee Commandery, Peter Englisberg, supported the secularization of the Commandery and received Bremgarten Castle as a reward.

The Swiss painter Ricco grew up in the castle where his parents Max and Tilli Wassmer threw lavish parties with well-known poets, painters and composers. Hermann Hesse described the atmosphere in the short novel Journey to the East.

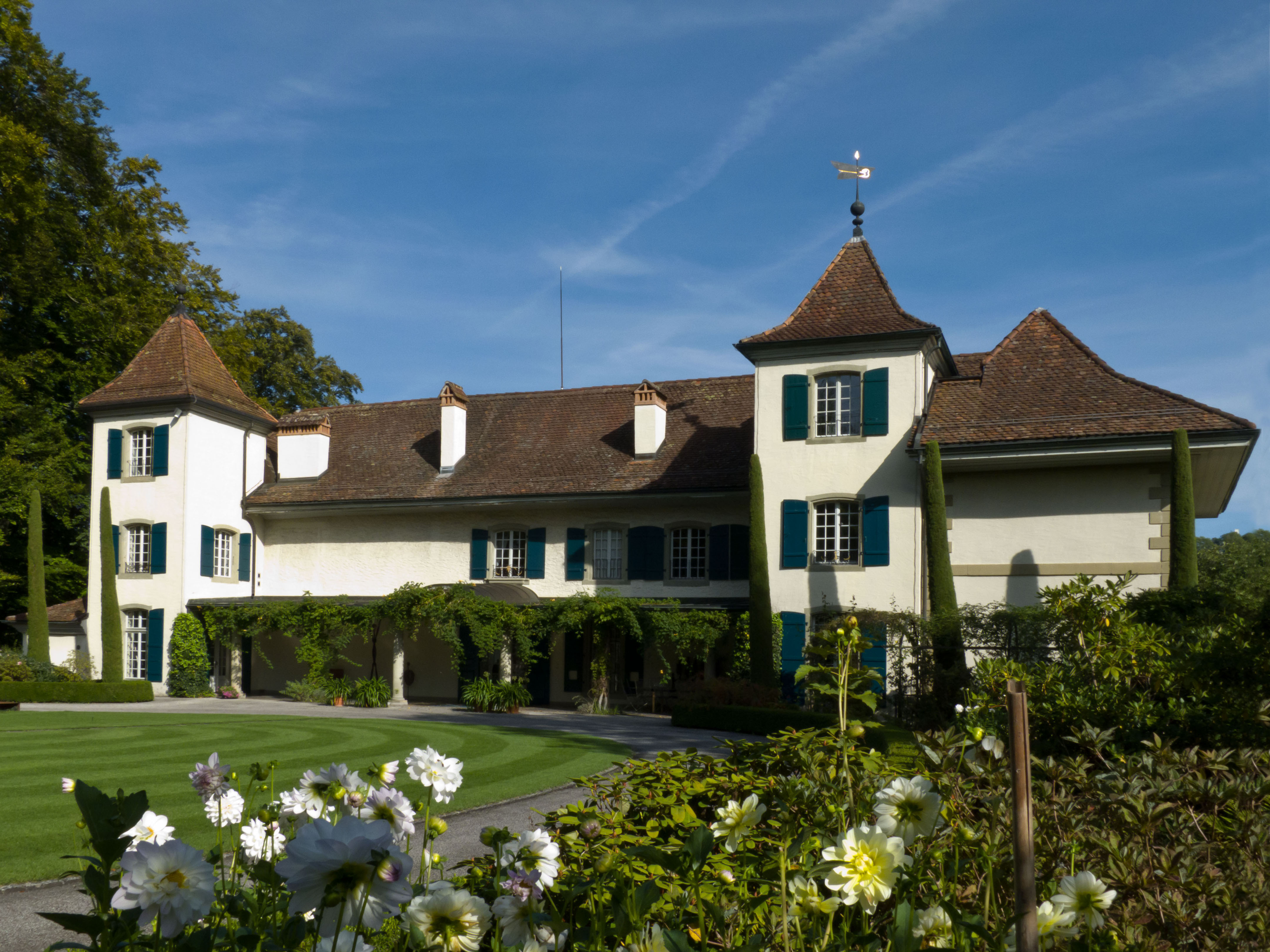
Bremgarten Castle

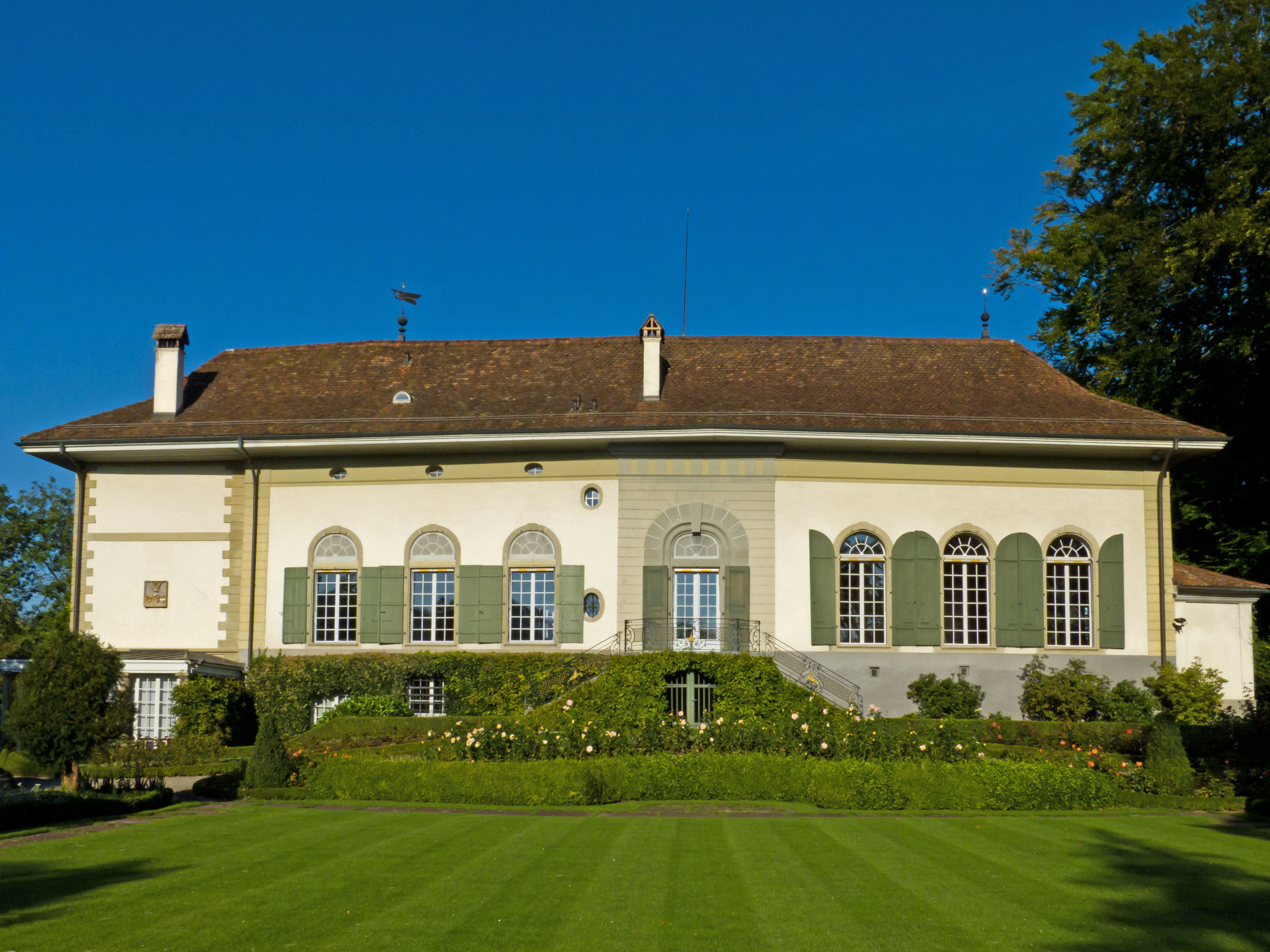
Garden front of Bremgarten Castle

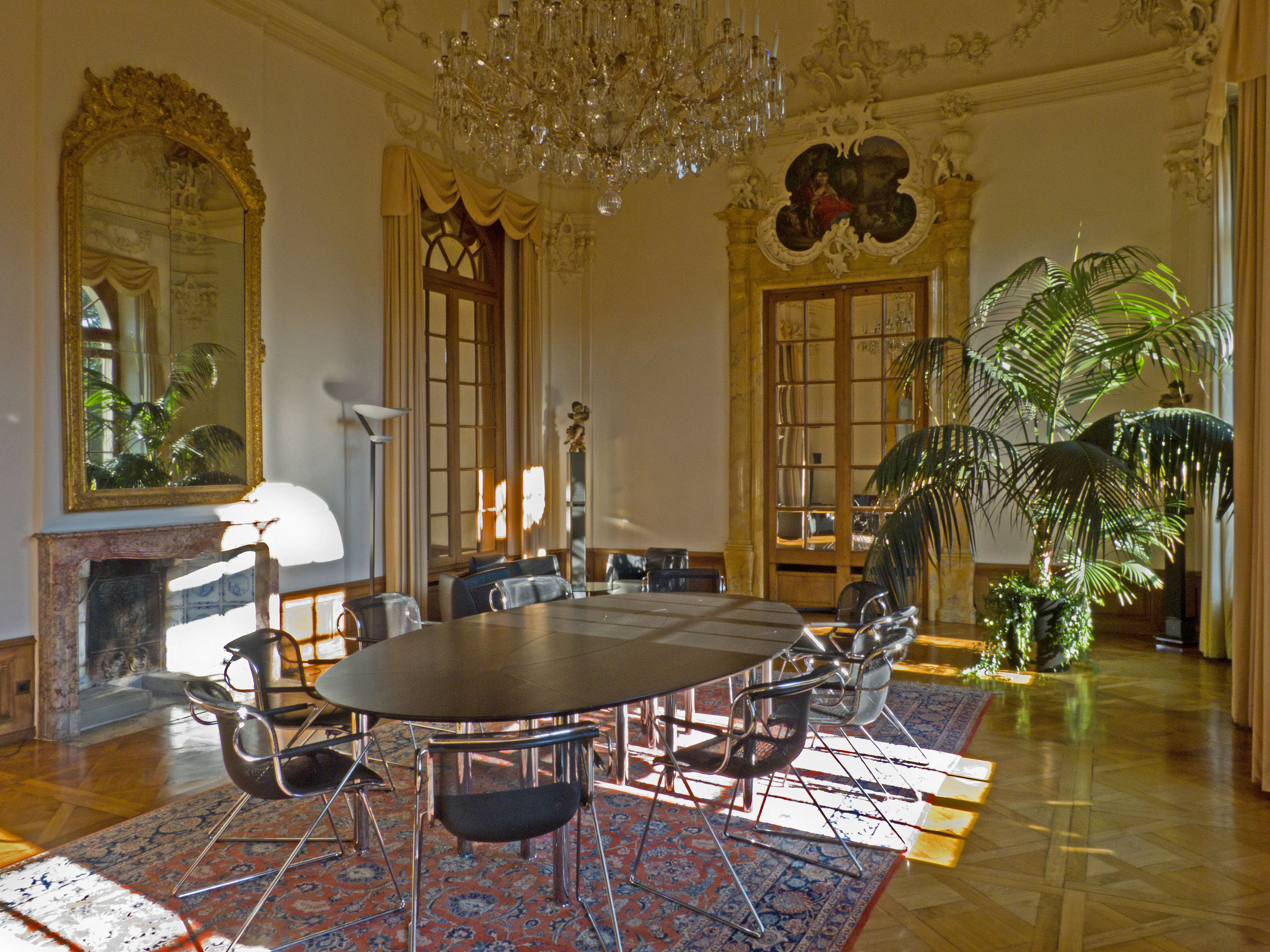
The Rococo Hall of Bremgarten Castle

== Politics ==
In the 2011 federal election the most popular party was the SPS which received 22.3% of the vote. The next three most popular parties were the SVP (17.9%), the BDP Party (15.2%) and the Green Party (14.6%). In the federal election, a total of 2,017 votes were cast, and the voter turnout was 63.6%.

== Economy ==
As of 2011, Bremgarten bei Bern had an unemployment rate of 1.3%. As of 2008, there were a total of 550 people employed in the municipality. Of these, there were 16 people employed in the primary economic sector and about 5 businesses involved in this sector. 34 people were employed in the secondary sector and there were 9 businesses in this sector. 500 people were employed in the tertiary sector, with 106 businesses in this sector.

In 2008 there were a total of 378 full-time equivalent jobs. The number of jobs in the primary sector was 10, all of which were in agriculture. The number of jobs in the secondary sector was 30 of which 4 or (13.3%) were in manufacturing and 26 (86.7%) were in construction. The number of jobs in the tertiary sector was 338. In the tertiary sector; 61 or 18.0% were in wholesale or retail sales or the repair of motor vehicles, 9 or 2.7% were in a hotel or restaurant, 19 or 5.6% were in the information industry, 6 or 1.8% were the insurance or financial industry, 39 or 11.5% were technical professionals or scientists, 43 or 12.7% were in education and 70 or 20.7% were in health care.

In 2000, there were 253 workers who commuted into the municipality and 1,654 workers who commuted away. The municipality is a net exporter of workers, with about 6.5 workers leaving the municipality for every one entering. Of the working population, 40.8% used public transportation to get to work, and 38.5% used a private car.

== Religion ==
From the 2000 census, 649 or 17.1% were Roman Catholic, while 2,440 or 64.2% belonged to the Swiss Reformed Church. Of the rest of the population, there were 27 members of an Orthodox church (or about 0.71% of the population), there were 8 individuals (or about 0.21% of the population) who belonged to the Christian Catholic Church, and there were 134 individuals (or about 3.52% of the population) who belonged to another Christian church. There were 8 individuals (or about 0.21% of the population) who were Jewish, and 56 (or about 1.47% of the population) who were Islamic. There were 11 individuals who were Buddhist, 26 individuals who were Hindu and 3 individuals who belonged to another church. 396 (or about 10.42% of the population) belonged to no church, are agnostic or atheist, and 108 individuals (or about 2.84% of the population) did not answer the question.

== Education ==
In Bremgarten bei Bern about 1,560 or (41.0%) of the population have completed non-mandatory upper secondary education, and 893 or (23.5%) have completed additional higher education (either university or a Fachhochschule). Of the 893 who completed tertiary schooling, 66.5% were Swiss men, 27.1% were Swiss women, 4.0% were non-Swiss men and 2.4% were non-Swiss women.

The Canton of Bern school system provides one year of non-obligatory Kindergarten, followed by six years of Primary school. This is followed by three years of obligatory lower Secondary school where the students are separated according to ability and aptitude. Following the lower Secondary students may attend additional schooling or they may enter an apprenticeship.

During the 2009-10 school year, there were a total of 430 students attending classes in Bremgarten bei Bern. There were 4 kindergarten classes with a total of 69 students in the municipality. Of the kindergarten students, 10.1% were permanent or temporary residents of Switzerland (not citizens) and 10.1% have a different mother language than the classroom language. The municipality had 13 primary classes and 251 students. Of the primary students, 11.6% were permanent or temporary residents of Switzerland (not citizens) and 12.0% have a different mother language than the classroom language. During the same year, there were 6 lower secondary classes with a total of 110 students. There were 5.5% who were permanent or temporary residents of Switzerland (not citizens) and 13.6% have a different mother language than the classroom language.

As of 2000, there were 11 students in Bremgarten bei Bern who came from another municipality, while 223 residents attended schools outside the municipality.

== Notable people born or resident in Bremgarten ==
- Adrian Frutiger, typeface designer.
- Ricco (1915–1972), painter.
