= Wiggiswil =

- Municipality
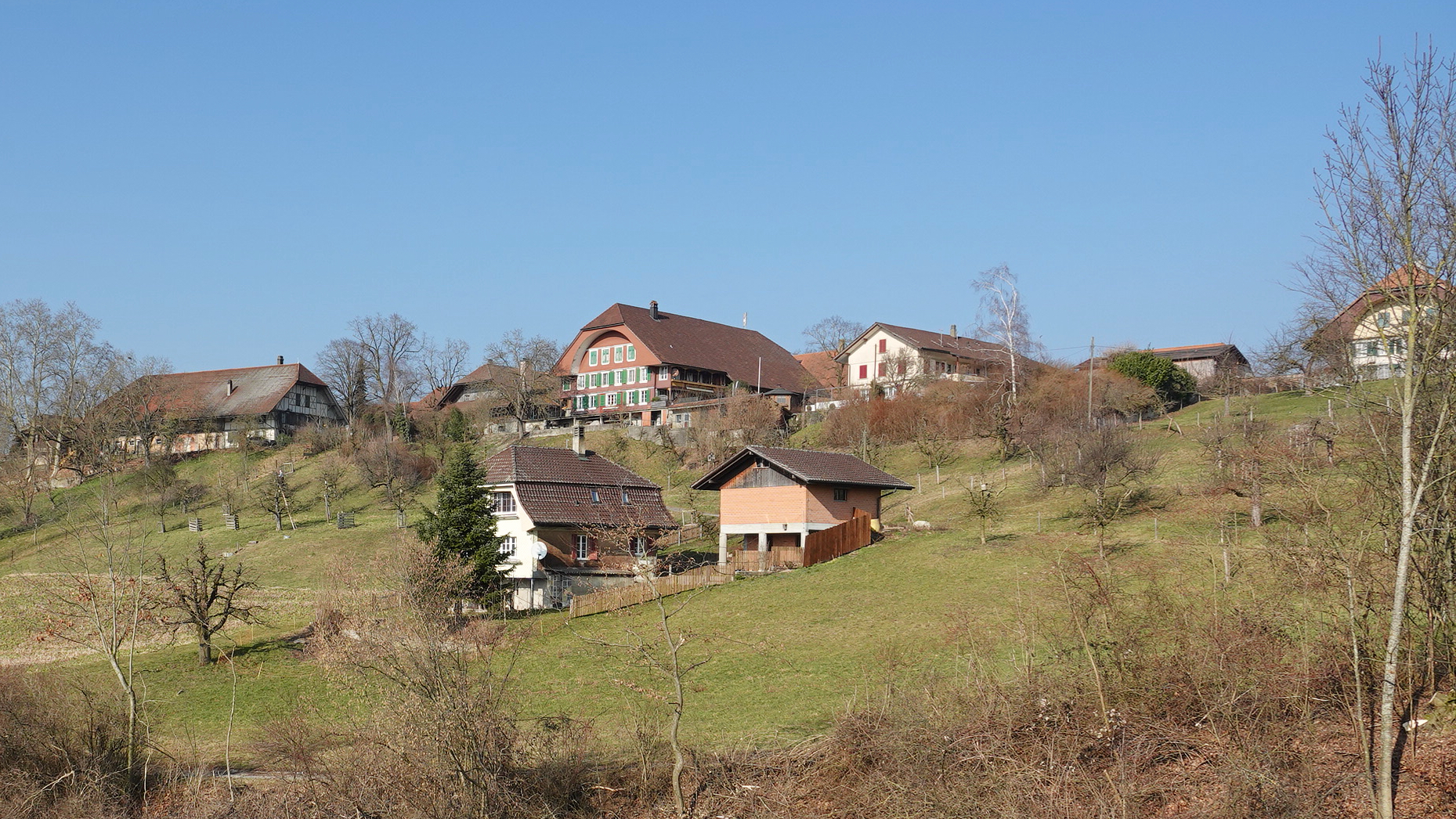

- Flag Coat of arms
- Location of Wiggiswil
- Location within Switzerland Location within Canton of Bern
- Coordinates: 47°2′N 7°28′E
- Country: Switzerland
- Canton: Bern
- District: Bern-Mittelland

Government
  - Executive: Gemeinderat with 5 members
  - Mayor: Gemeindepräsident(in); Robert Rubi (as of 2026)

Area
  - Total: 1.4 km^{2} (0.54 sq mi)
- Elevation: 554 m (1,818 ft)

Population (December 2020)
  - Total: 103
  - Density: 74/km^{2} (190/sq mi)
- Time zone: UTC+01:00 (CET)
  - Summer (DST): UTC+02:00 (CEST)
- Postal code: 3053
- SFOS number: 553
- ISO 3166 code: CH-BE
- Surrounded by: Ballmoos, Deisswil bei Münchenbuchsee, Moosseedorf, Münchenbuchsee, Urtenen-Schönbühl
- Website: https://wiggiswil.ch/

Wiggiswil is a municipality in the Bern-Mittelland administrative district in the canton of Bern in Switzerland.

== History ==
Wiggiswil is first mentioned in 1219 as Wigersvile.

The oldest trace of a settlement in the area comes from scattered prehistoric flint tools which were found around the Moossee. Roman era artifacts have been discovered in Wiggiswil village and at Seerain.

Throughout its history Wiggiswil has always been dependent on the neighboring village of Deisswil bei Münchenbuchsee. Even in the 21st century, the two small municipalities share a single town council. It is part of the parish of Münchenbuchsee.

In 1973 the A6 motorway was built through the municipality. The motorway connects Wiggiswil to the cities of Bern and Biel/Bienne, however, the village has remained mostly agricultural. The village is home to the famous Moospinte hotel and restaurant which is over 150 years old. During World War II, Swiss commanding general Henri Guisan sometimes used the Moospinte for secret meetings with government officials.

== Geography ==
Wiggiswil has an area of 1.44 km^{2} (0.56 sq mi). Of this area, 0.98 km^{2} (0.38 mi^{2}) or 68.5% is used for agricultural purposes, while 0.18 km^{2} (0.069 mi^{2}) or 12.6% is forested. Of the rest of the land, 0.24 km^{2} (0.093 mi^{2}) or 16.8% is settled (buildings or roads), 0.01 km^{2} (2.5 acres) or 0.7% is either rivers or lakes and 0.02 km^{2} (4.9 acres) or 1.4% is unproductive land.

Of the built up area, housing and buildings made up 3.5% and transportation infrastructure made up 8.4%. while parks, green belts and sports fields made up 4.2%. Out of the forested land, all of the forested land area is covered with heavy forests. Of the agricultural land, 55.9% is used for growing crops and 11.2% is pastures, while 1.4% is used for orchards or vine crops. All the water in the municipality is in lakes.

The municipality is located on the north-west edge of the Moossee valley.

On 31 December 2009 Amtsbezirk Fraubrunnen, the municipality's former district, was dissolved. On the following day, 1 January 2010, it joined the newly created Verwaltungskreis Bern-Mittelland.

== Coat of arms ==
The blazon of the municipal coat of arms is Azure a Griffin Argent beaked, langued, winged, membered and armed Or.

== Demographics ==
Wiggiswil has a population (as of December 2020) of 103. As of 2010, 4.0% of the population are resident foreign nationals. Over the last 10 years (2000-2010) the population has changed at a rate of 14.8%. Migration accounted for 9.1%, while births and deaths accounted for 6.8%.

Most of the population (as of 2000) speaks German (89 or 91.8%) as their first language, Portuguese is the second most common (3 or 3.1%) and Polish is the third (2 or 2.1%).

As of 2008, the population was 47.5% male and 52.5% female. The population was made up of 45 Swiss men (44.6% of the population) and 3 non-Swiss men. There were 52 Swiss women (51.5%) and 1 non-Swiss women. Of the population in the municipality, 29 or about 29.9% were born in Wiggiswil and lived there in 2000. There were 41 or 42.3% who were born in the same canton, while 10 or 10.3% were born somewhere else in Switzerland, and 15 or 15.5% were born outside of Switzerland.

As of 2010, children and teenagers (0–19 years old) make up 20.8% of the population, while adults (20–64 years old) make up 60.4% and seniors (over 64 years old) make up 18.8%.

As of 2000, there were 50 people who were single and never married in the municipality. There were 39 married individuals, 3 widows or widowers and 5 individuals who are divorced.

As of 2000, there were 10 households that consist of only one person and 2 households with five or more people. In 2000, a total of 34 apartments (89.5% of the total) were permanently occupied, while 2 apartments (5.3%) were seasonally occupied and 2 apartments (5.3%) were empty.

The historical population is given in the following chart:

== Sights ==
The entire hamlet of Wiggiswil is designated as part of the Inventory of Swiss Heritage Sites.

== Politics ==
In the 2011 federal election the most popular party was the Swiss People's Party (SVP) which received 42.5% of the vote. The next two most popular parties were the Conservative Democratic Party (BDP) (17.9%), and the Social Democratic Party (SP) (12.3%). In the federal election, a total of 104 votes were cast, and the voter turnout was 65.4%.

== Economy ==
As of 2011, Wiggiswil had an unemployment rate of 0.86%. As of 2008, there were a total of 51 people employed in the municipality. Of these, there were 24 people employed in the primary economic sector and about 6 businesses involved in this sector. 6 people were employed in the secondary sector and there was 1 business in this sector. 21 people were employed in the tertiary sector, with 1 business in this sector. There were 68 residents of the municipality who were employed in some capacity, of which females made up 36.8% of the workforce.

In 2008 there were a total of 41 full-time equivalent jobs. The number of jobs in the primary sector was 17, all in agriculture. The number of jobs in the secondary sector was 5, all in manufacturing. The number of jobs in the tertiary sector was 19, all in a hotel or restaurant.

In 2000, there were 13 workers who commuted into the municipality and 34 workers who commuted away. The municipality is a net exporter of workers, with about 2.6 workers leaving the municipality for every one entering. Of the working population, 8.8% used public transportation to get to work, and 44.1% used a private car.

== Religion ==
From the 2000 census, 14 or 14.4% were Roman Catholic, while 62 or 63.9% belonged to the Swiss Reformed Church. Of the rest of the population, there were 5 members of an Orthodox church (or about 5.15% of the population). 14 (or about 14.43% of the population) belonged to no church, are agnostic or atheist, and 2 individuals (or about 2.06% of the population) did not answer the question.

== Education ==
In Wiggiswil about 44 or (45.4%) of the population have completed non-mandatory upper secondary education, and 24 or (24.7%) have completed additional higher education (either university or a Fachhochschule). Of the 24 who completed tertiary schooling, 50.0% were Swiss men, 41.7% were Swiss women.

The Canton of Bern school system provides one year of non-obligatory Kindergarten, followed by six years of Primary school. This is followed by three years of obligatory lower Secondary school where the students are separated according to ability and aptitude. Following the lower Secondary students may attend additional schooling or they may enter an apprenticeship.

During the 2010-11 school year, there were a total of 13 students attending classes in Wiggiswil. There were no kindergarten classes in the municipality. There were 12 primary students from the municipality who attended school in a neighboring municipality. During the same year, there was one lower secondary class with one student.

As of 2000, there were 8 students in Wiggiswil who came from another municipality, while 3 residents attended schools outside the municipality.
