= Bremgarten Castle =

- Schloss Bremgarten (German)
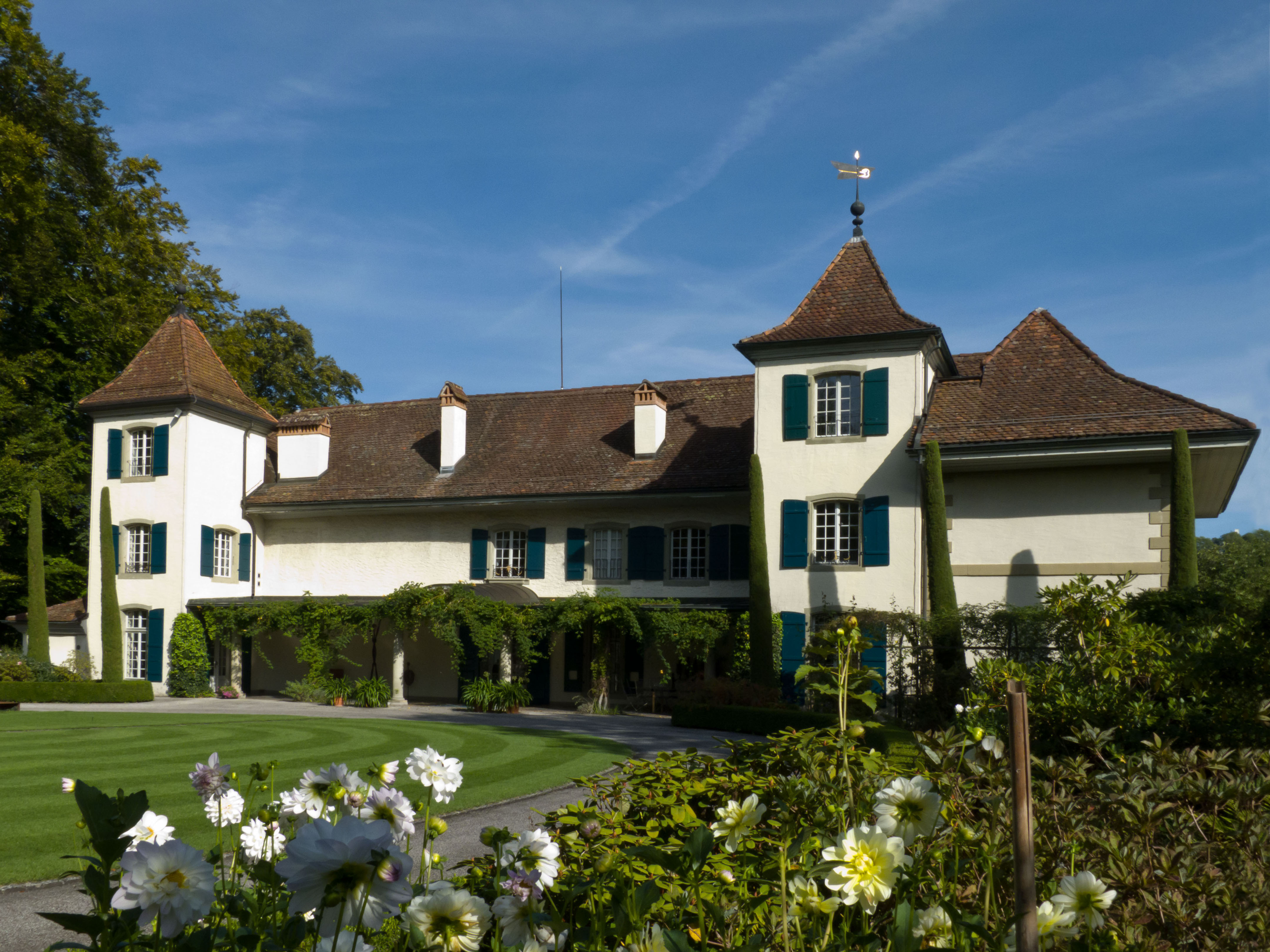
- Bremgarten Castle

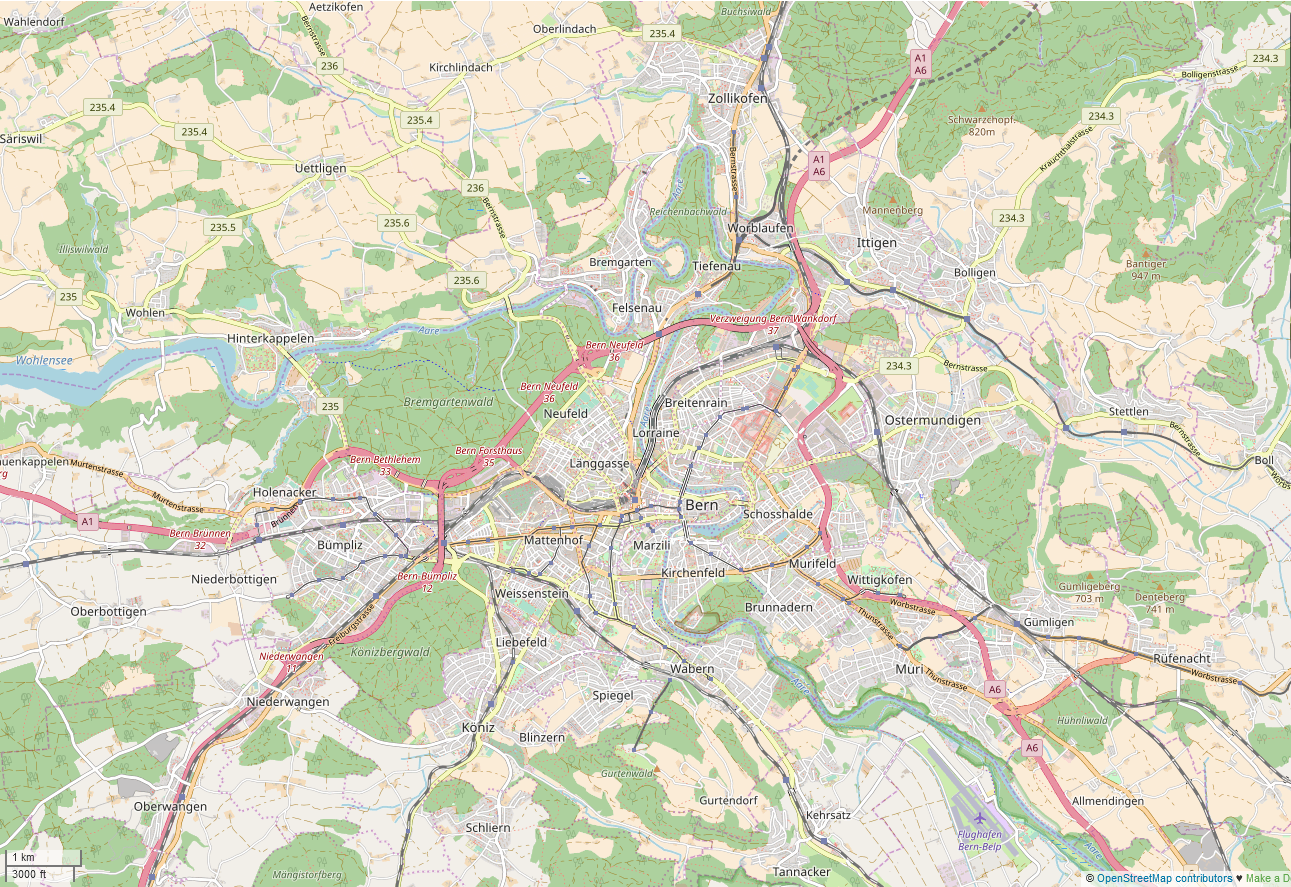
- Location within Bern Location within Canton of Bern Location within Switzerland
- 46.9776°N 7.4433°E
- Location: Bremgarten bei Bern

History
- Built: 16th century
- Rebuilt: 1780

Site notes
- Architectural style: Baroque

Swiss Cultural Property of National Significance

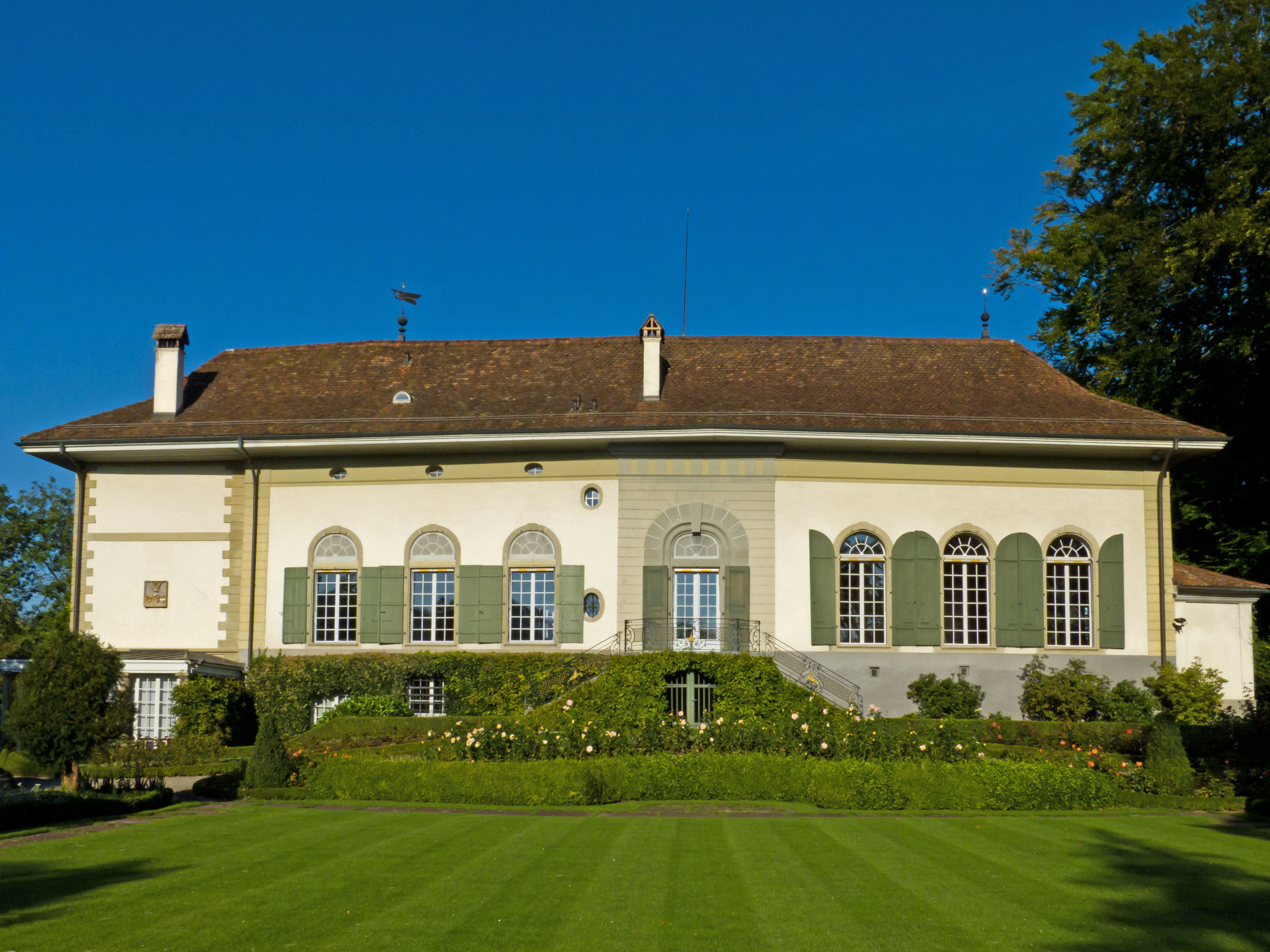
Garden front of Bremgarten Castle

Bremgarten Castle (German: Schloss Bremgarten) is a castle in the municipality of Bremgarten of the canton of Bern in Switzerland. It is a Swiss heritage site of national significance.

== History ==
The first castle at Bremgarten was the ancestral home of the Barons of Bremgarten, who are first mentioned during the mid-12th century. The Barons' family church, St. Michaels, was first mentioned in 1275, though it was probably from the 10th or 11th century. The Barons ruled over lands that stretched along the Aare river at least as far as from Worblaufen to Kirchlindach. In early 1298, Fribourg and her allied nobles, including the Barons of Bremgarten, fought Bern in the Jammer valley at Donnerbühl. The battle was a Bernese victory and shortly thereafter Bern conquered and burned Bremgarten town and after a short siege destroyed the castle.

By 1306 the three Bremgarten brothers had a ruined town, a ruined castle and mounting debts. They were forced to sell their lands, castle, rights and ferry to the Knights Hospitaller commandry of Buchsee (Münchenbuchsee). The commandry rebuilt the ruined town and castle and made it into a residence and headquarters of the commander. During the Protestant Reformation in 1528, the last Commander of the commandery, Peter Englisberg, supported the secularization of the Commandery and was allowed to retire to Bremgarten Castle as a reward.

After the death of Peter Englisberg in 1528 the Bernese government sold the land and castle to the conqueror of Vaud, Schultheiss Hans Franz Nägeli. He demolished the old castle, except for the keep and curtain walls, and had a renaissance country manor built. After the death of Schultheiss Nägeli in 1579 the castle went to the Knight banneret Ludwig Brüggler who had married Nägeli's second daughter. After the death of Brüggler in 1598, it was bought by Knight banneret Niklaus Kilchberg who gave it to his son, also named Niklaus. It remained with the Kilchberg family until 1727 when it was sold to Marc Elie de Chemilleret of Biel for 15,000 pounds. In 1743 it went to Gabriel von Wattenwyl who was the nephew of Marc Elie's second wife, Magdalena von Watteville. Fischer von Reichenbach bought it in 1761 for 80,000 pounds, but sold it four years later in 1765 to Albrecht Frisching.

Albrecht Frisching was a professor of the Greek language in Bern, had been a member of the Grand Council in 1775 and governor of Landshut from 1782 to 1789. By 1780 Frisching completely rebuilt the old castle converting it into a baroque summer palace. He had the entrance to the castle expanded and rebuilt. The castle hill was built up and leveled to create a spacious courtyard and gardens around the castle. In 1803, after the Act of Mediation, Albrecht Frisching refused a seat on the Grand Council and instead retired to Bremgarten Castle.

The Swiss painter Ricco grew up in the castle where his parents Max and Tilli Wassmer threw lavish parties with well-known poets, painters and composers. Hermann Hesse described the atmosphere in the short novel Journey to the East.

== See also ==
- List of castles in Switzerland
