= Moosseedorf =

- Municipality
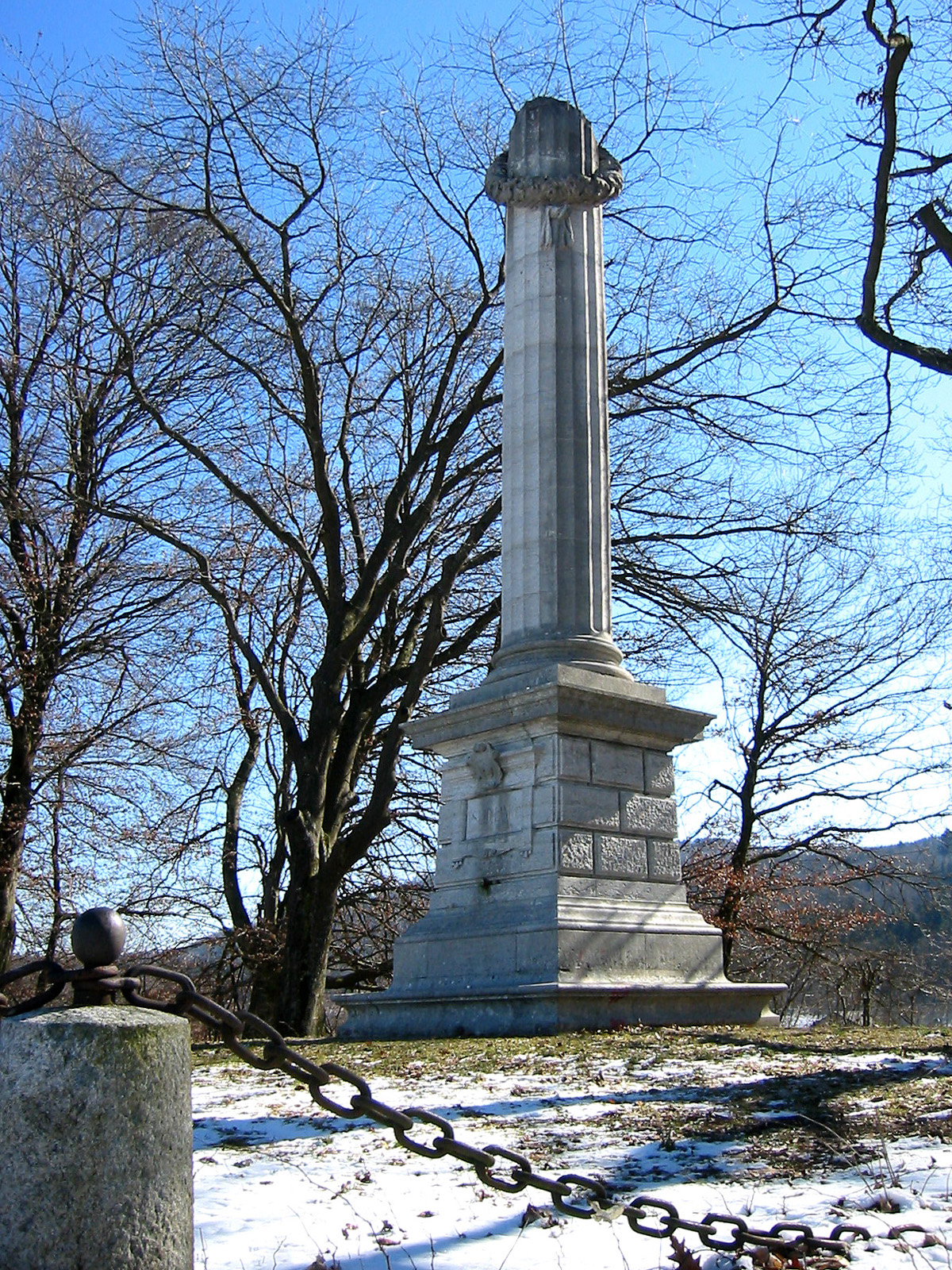
- Memorial to the Battle of Grauholz

- Flag Coat of arms
- Location of Moosseedorf
- Location within Switzerland Location within Canton of Bern
- Coordinates: 47°1′N 7°29′E
- Country: Switzerland
- Canton: Bern
- District: Bern-Mittelland

Government
  - Executive: Gemeinderat with 7 members
  - Mayor: Gemeindepräsident(in); Stefan Meier SPS/PSS (as of 2026)

Area
  - Total: 6.3 km^{2} (2.4 sq mi)
- Elevation: 532 m (1,745 ft)

Population (December 2020)
  - Total: 4,092
  - Density: 650/km^{2} (1,700/sq mi)
- Time zone: UTC+01:00 (CET)
  - Summer (DST): UTC+02:00 (CEST)
- Postal code: 3302
- SFOS number: 544
- ISO 3166 code: CH-BE
- Surrounded by: Bolligen, Ittigen, Münchenbuchsee, Urtenen-Schönbühl, Wiggiswil
- Website: moosseedorf.ch

Moosseedorf is a municipality in the Bern-Mittelland administrative district in the canton of Bern in Switzerland. The village is located south of Moossee, the lake that gives it its name.

== History ==
Moosseedorf is first mentioned in 1242 as Sedorf. In 1389 it was mentioned as Mossedorf. In the 18th and early 19th century, it officially became Moosseedorf to avoid confusion with Seedorf in the District of Aarberg, which is also in the Canton of Bern.

=== Prehistoric Moosseedorf ===
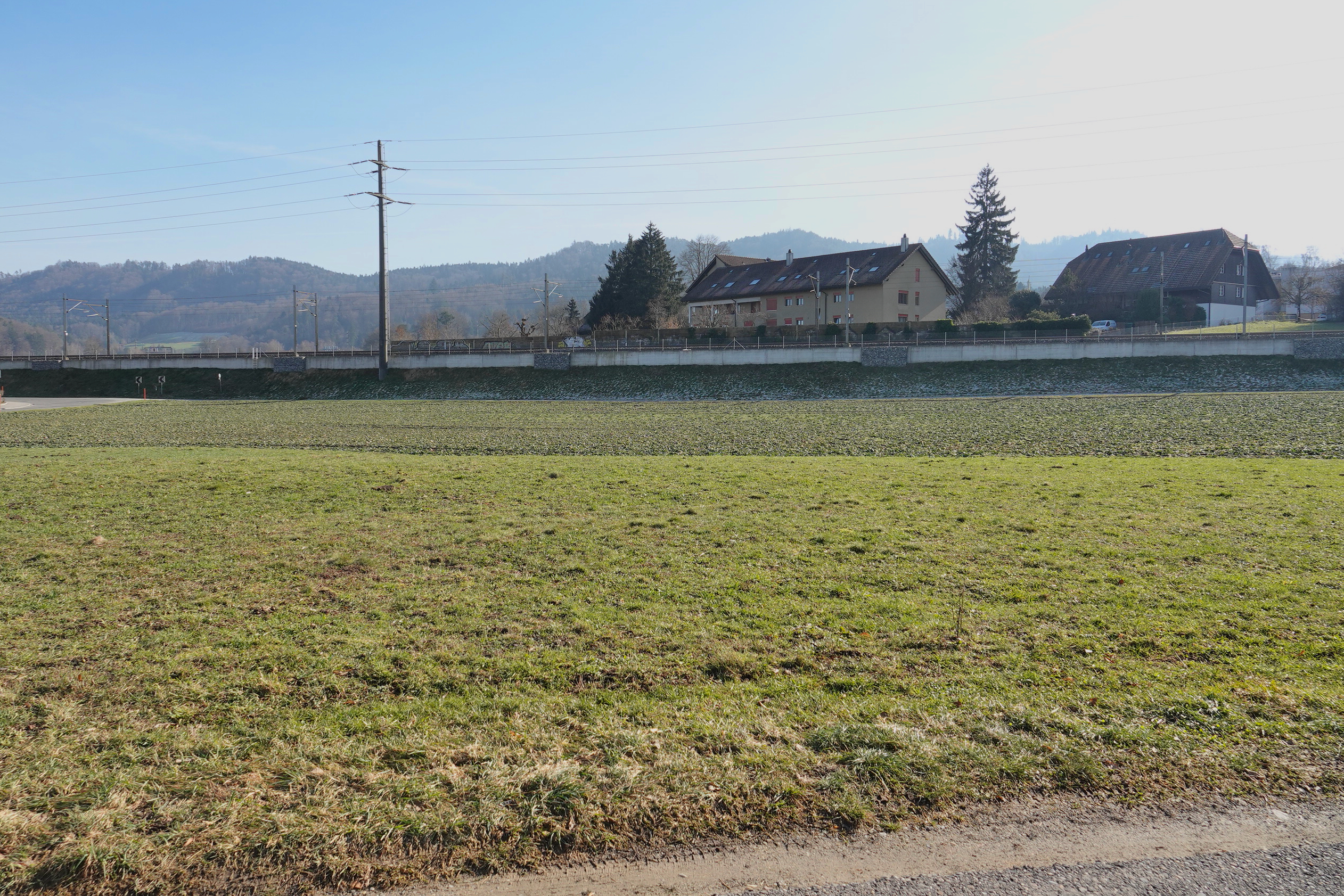
Moosbühl site

Two of the largest paleolithic sites in Switzerland, Moosbühl I and II, are located on a low hill near Moossee Lake. The sites date to the last Ice Age (about 13,500 BC) and contain over 70,000 Magdalenian flints. Other discoveries include a needle of bone, ochre beads for dye, lignite pearls, a female statuette made from jet (height 2.2 cm [0.87 in]) as well as fragments of imported amber from the Baltic region. Fire pits surrounded by what appear to be tent sites were also discovered. A number of animal skeletons and bones show that the people at Moosbühl mostly hunted reindeer.

In addition to Moosbühl I and II, in 1856 several neolithic lake shore settlements were found on both ends of the lake. The larger eastern site contained a number of Cortaillod culture pottery fragments from the first half of the 4th millennium BC. In 1886 workers excavating a site for a monument to the Battle of Grauholz, allegedly discovered a late-Bronze Age grave, which probably dated to around 1300 BC. According to reports, the grave contained several small tools and jewelry. However, the site was destroyed in construction and any artifacts were lost.

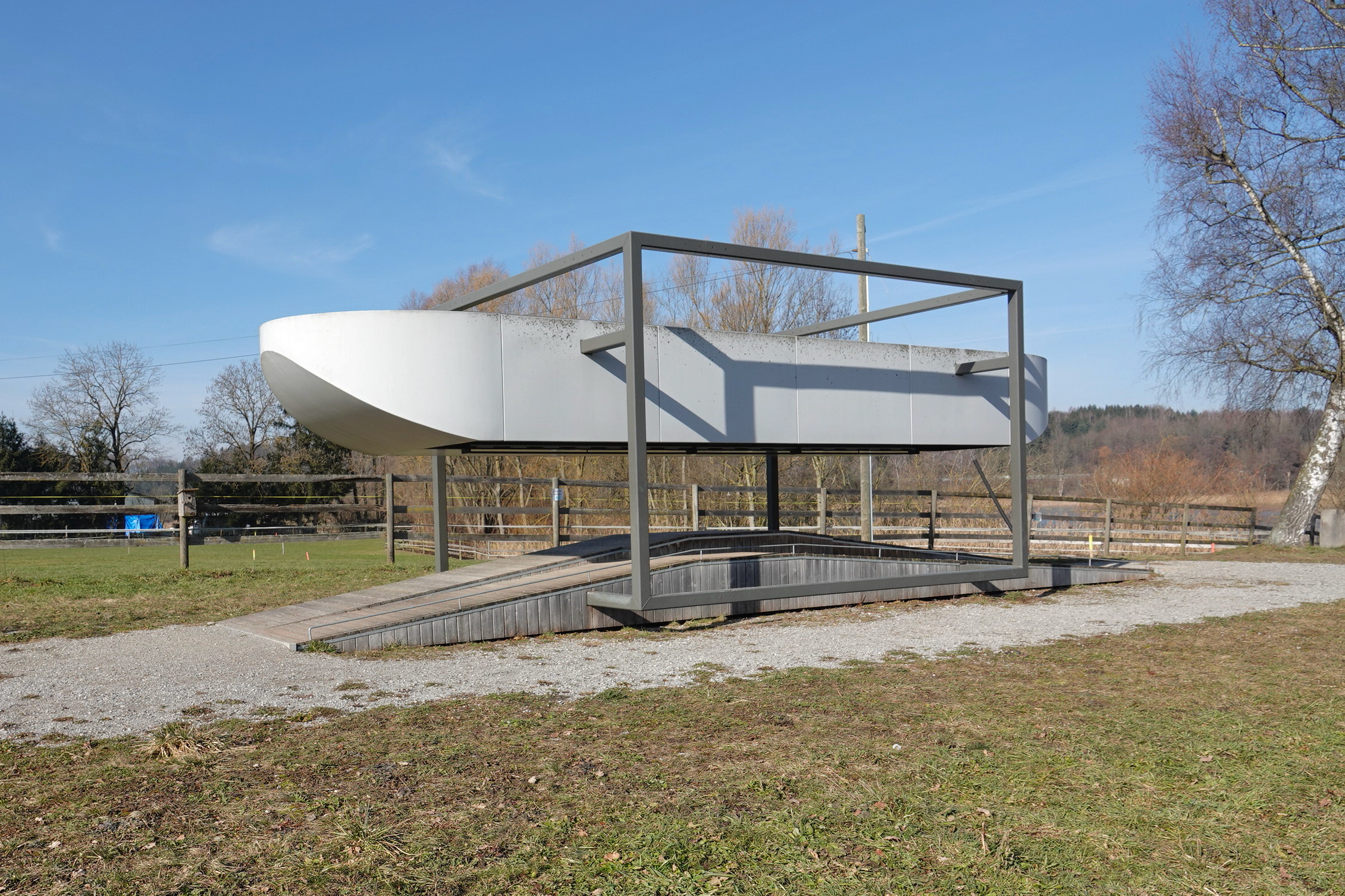
Dugout canoe of lake Moossee

In 2011 the remains of a prehistoric dugout canoe were found during construction work on the premises of the public swimming pool at lake Moossee. The artifacts were dated to about 4500 BC. Today, they are shown to the public in a custom made display case close to where they were found.

=== Medieval and early modern Moosseedorf ===
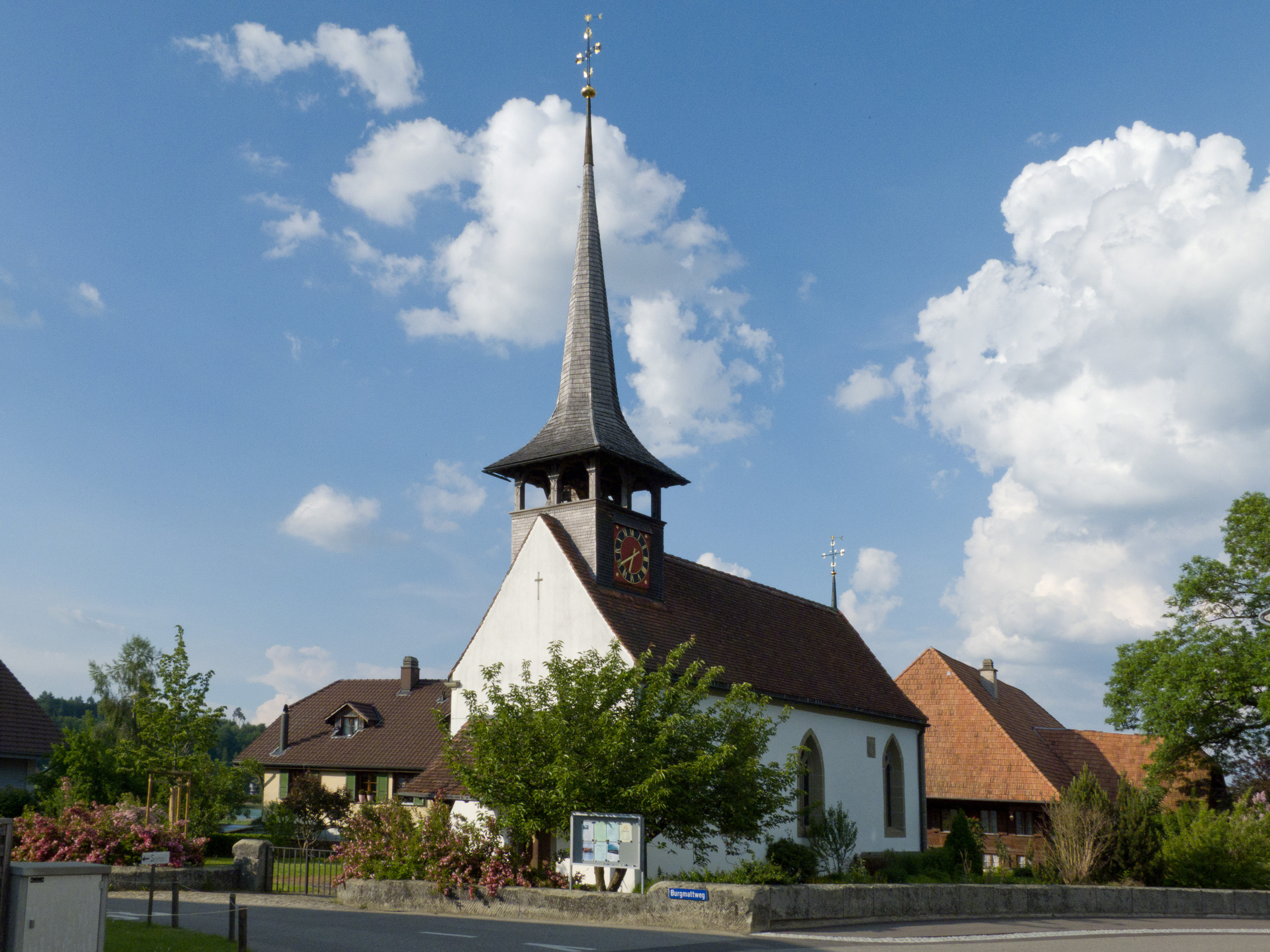
Moosseedorf village church

During the Middle Ages the village belonged to the Kyburg Ministerialis (unfree knights in the service of a feudal overlord) family of Seedorf or Moser. The family only appears in historical records during the 13th and 14th centuries, so very little is known about their history or their rule. One well documented record comes from 1242 when they quarreled with the Priory of St. Peter's Island over the patronage rights to Moosseedorf's village church. They ruled over Moosseedorf from their water castle which was located about 100 meters (330 ft) northeast of the village church. However, in 1256-57 the brothers Ulrich and Berchtold von Seedorf traded their estates in Moosseedorf to the Knights Hospitaller of Münchenbuchsee Commandery for other estates. The Commandery acquired control over the castle, church, land and people in the village. In 1528 Bern adopted the Protestant Reformation and secularized all Bernese monasteries including the Münchenbuchsee Commandery. Moosseedorf village became part of the secular bailiwick and low court of Münchenbuchsee. In 1721 Bern traded the village to Hieronymus von Erlach, who then combined the village with Hofwil, linking the local court with that in Hofwil.

The Romanesque village church was built on top of at least one earlier church. The choir was rebuilt around 1520–25.

=== Moosseedorf in the 19th and 20th centuries ===
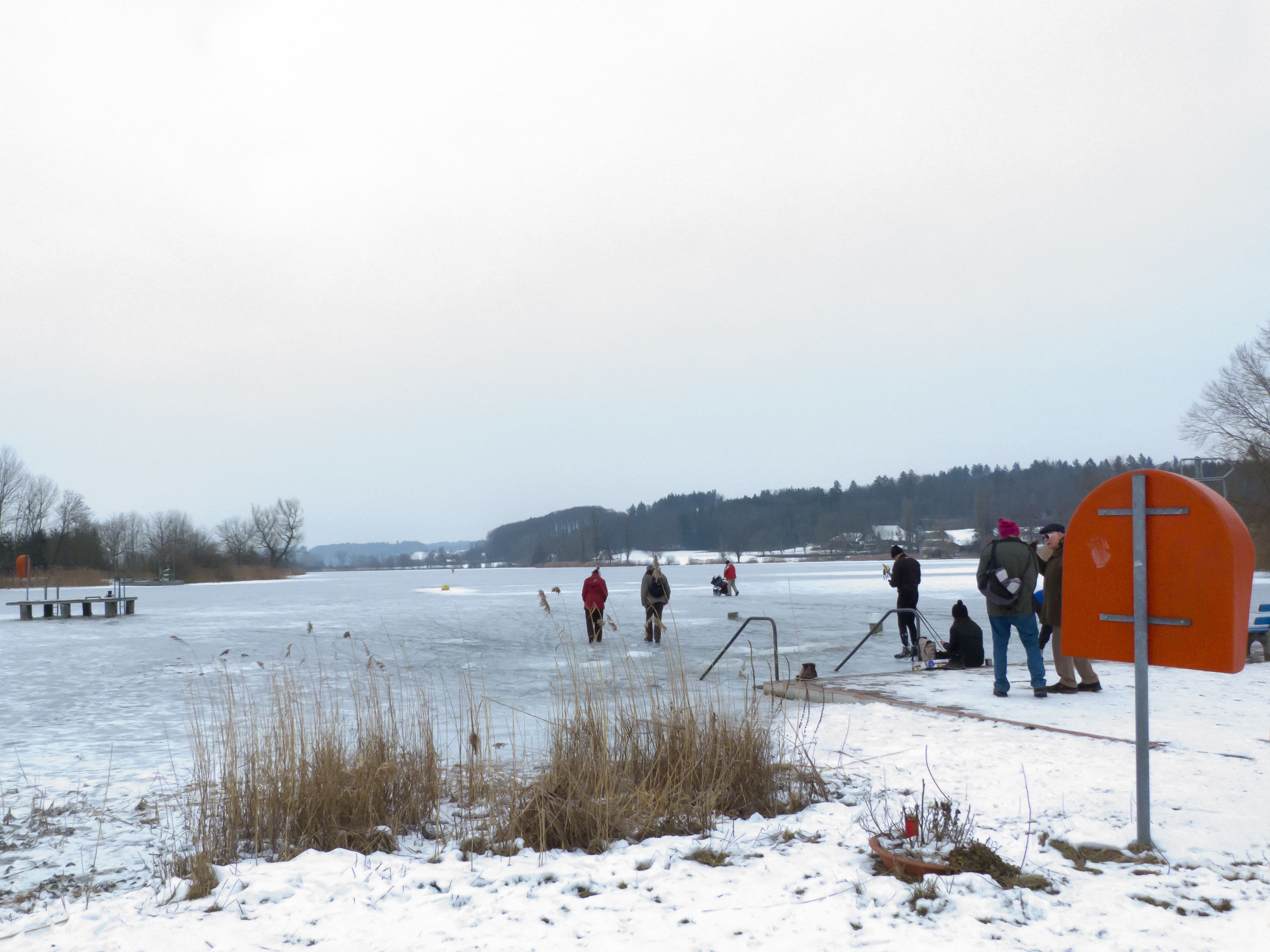
Moossee Lake in winter

Aerial view from 300 m by Walter Mittelholzer (1925)

Following the 1798 French invasion, the Erlach family lost their authority in Moosseedorf. With the Act of Mediation in 1803, Moosseedorf became part of the Fraubrunnen district.

The first attempt to drain the marshy land around the lake was made in the 1770s by Johann Rudolf Tschiffeli. He was able to drain the marsh around his country estate but most of the marshy land remained. Around 1780 the course of the Urtenen river was corrected and its water level dropped, opening up new farmland in the Moossee valley. Further projects in 1855-56 and 1917-20 drained the marshes and adjusted the river course.

The village lay on the road to Bern, which was rebuilt in 1846. In 1916 the Bern-Solothurn-Zollikofen Railway (now Regionalverkehr Bern-Solothurn) built a rail station in the village. Despite good transportation links, the village remained overwhelmingly rural and agricultural. The character of the village only began to change after the construction of the A6 (Bern-Biel) and A1 motorways (Bern-Zurich) after 1962. Large shopping centers, industrial companies and small businesses moved into the growing municipality. More jobs drove dramatic population growth, which strained the local infrastructure. The municipality built several new schools and other services. Between 1966 and 1985 they built three new schools and in 1985 opened a secondary school. In 1987 the Tannacker Foundation built a facility to provide support, employment and housing for the region's disabled. The Small and the Large Moossee Lakes became protected areas in 1954 and 1963 respectively. The municipality also includes part of the military training base Im Sand, which was established in 1901–12.

== Geography ==
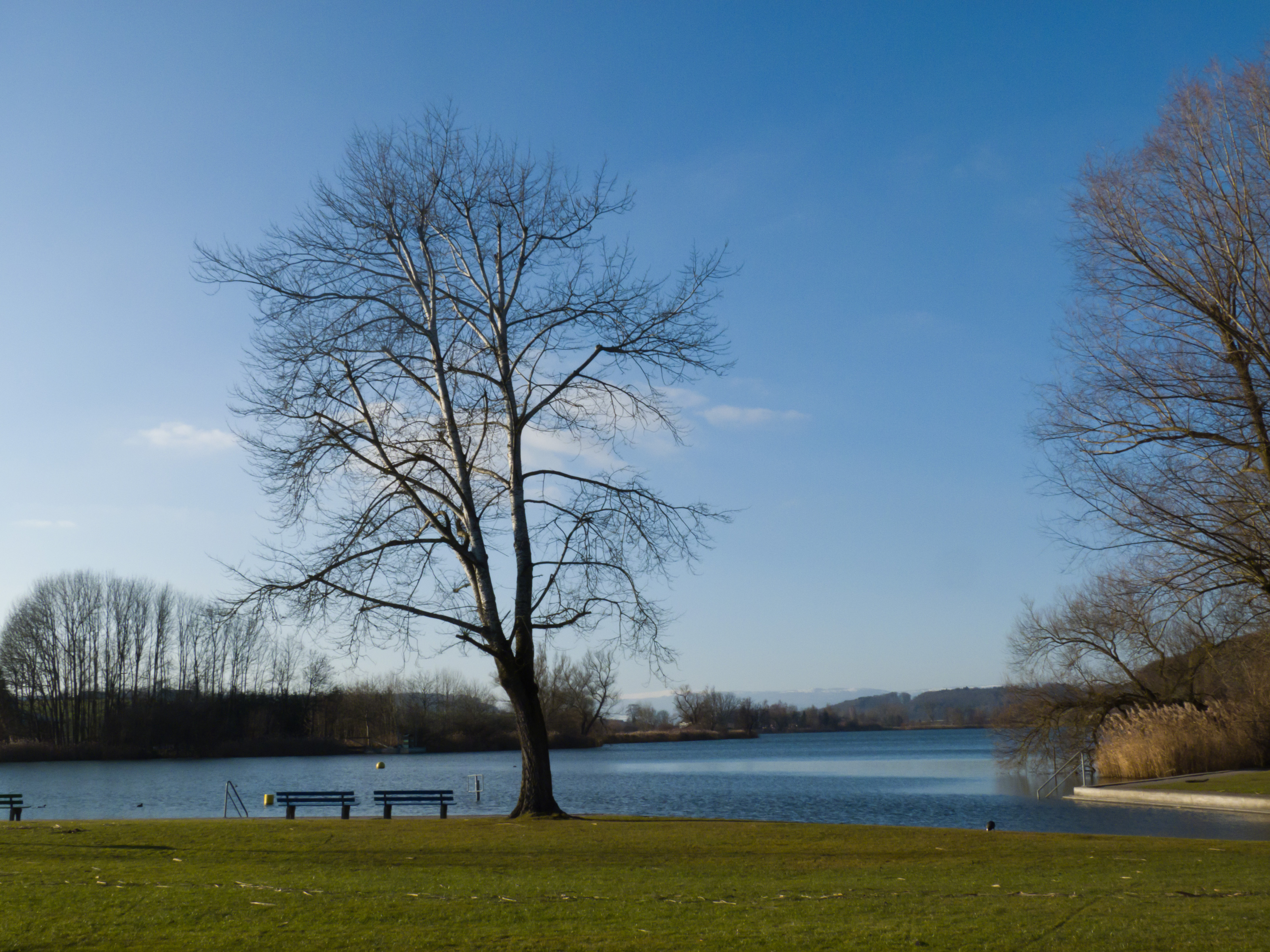
Lake Moossee

Moosseedorf has an area of 6.38 km^{2} (2.46 sq mi). Of this area, 1.91 km^{2} (0.74 mi^{2}) or 30.1% is used for agricultural purposes, while 2.27 km^{2} (0.88 mi^{2}) or 35.7% is forested. Of the rest of the land, 1.93 km^{2} (0.75 mi^{2}) or 30.4% is settled (buildings or roads), 0.11 km^{2} (27 acres) or 1.7% is either rivers or lakes and 0.1 km^{2} (25 acres) or 1.6% is unproductive land.

Of the built up area, industrial buildings made up 3.3% of the total area while housing and buildings made up 9.6% and transportation infrastructure made up 7.6%. while parks, green belts and sports fields made up 9.0%. Out of the forested land, all of the forested land area is covered with heavy forests. Of the agricultural land, 23.0% is used for growing crops and 6.3% is pastures. All the water in the municipality is in lakes.

Moosseedorf is located in the Moossee valley south of the lake. The municipality includes the village of Moosseedorf and the hamlets of Sand, Tannacker and Anteil am See. It belongs to the parish church of Münchenbuchsee but has a resident preacher and a cemetery.

On 31 December 2009 Amtsbezirk Fraubrunnen, the municipality's former district, was dissolved. On the following day, 1 January 2010, it joined the newly created Verwaltungskreis Bern-Mittelland.

== Coat of arms ==
The blazon of the municipal coat of arms is Azure over three barrulets wavy Argent a Boat with an Oar Or.

== Demographics ==
Moosseedorf has a population (as of December 2020) of 4,092. As of 2010, 17.1% of the population are resident foreign nationals. Over the last 10 years (2000–2010) the population has changed at a rate of 1.6%. Migration accounted for -1.6%, while births and deaths accounted for 4%.

Most of the population (as of 2000) speaks German (3,219 or 89.8%) as their first language, French is the second most common (71 or 2.0%) and Albanian is the third (55 or 1.5%). There are 41 people who speak Italian and 2 people who speak Romansh.

As of 2008, the population was 49.6% male and 50.4% female. The population was made up of 1,450 Swiss men (40.6% of the population) and 323 (9.0%) non-Swiss men. There were 1,510 Swiss women (42.3%) and 288 (8.1%) non-Swiss women. Of the population in the municipality, 716 or about 20.0% were born in Moosseedorf and lived there in 2000. There were 1,626 or 45.4% who were born in the same canton, while 569 or 15.9% were born somewhere else in Switzerland, and 526 or 14.7% were born outside of Switzerland.

As of 2010, children and teenagers (0–19 years old) make up 20.8% of the population, while adults (20–64 years old) make up 64.3% and seniors (over 64 years old) make up 14.8%.

As of 2000, there were 1,544 people who were single and never married in the municipality. There were 1,714 married individuals, 124 widows or widowers and 202 individuals who are divorced.

As of 2000, there were 405 households that consist of only one person and 79 households with five or more people. In 2000, a total of 1,383 apartments (91.2% of the total) were permanently occupied, while 104 apartments (6.9%) were seasonally occupied and 30 apartments (2.0%) were empty. As of 2010, the construction rate of new housing units was 0.3 new units per 1000 residents. The vacancy rate for the municipality, in 2011, was 1.7%.

The historical population is given in the following chart:

== Heritage sites of national significance ==
The Paleolithic settlement at Moosbühl is listed as a Swiss heritage site of national significance. The Im Sand area is part of the Inventory of Swiss Heritage Sites.

== Politics ==
In the 2011 federal election the most popular party was the Swiss People's Party (SVP) which received 31.9% of the vote. The next three most popular parties were the Social Democratic Party (SP) (20.2%), the Conservative Democratic Party (BDP) (17.4%) and the FDP.The Liberals (6.9%). In the federal election, a total of 1,165 votes were cast, and the voter turnout was 47.0%.

== Economy ==
As of 2011, Moosseedorf had an unemployment rate of 3.14%. As of 2008, there were a total of 4,184 people employed in the municipality. Of these, there were 35 people employed in the primary economic sector and about 13 businesses involved in this sector. 924 people were employed in the secondary sector and there were 30 businesses in this sector. 3,225 people were employed in the tertiary sector, with 129 businesses in this sector. There were 2,053 residents of the municipality who were employed in some capacity, of which females made up 45.1% of the workforce.

In 2008 there were a total of 3,597 full-time equivalent jobs. The number of jobs in the primary sector was 23, all of which were in agriculture. The number of jobs in the secondary sector was 894 of which 303 or (33.9%) were in manufacturing and 590 (66.0%) were in construction. The number of jobs in the tertiary sector was 2,680. In the tertiary sector; 844 or 31.5% were in wholesale or retail sales or the repair of motor vehicles, 593 or 22.1% were in the movement and storage of goods, 89 or 3.3% were in a hotel or restaurant, 869 or 32.4% were technical professionals or scientists, 10 or 0.4% were in education and 137 or 5.1% were in health care.

In 2000, there were 3,093 workers who commuted into the municipality and 1,571 workers who commuted away. The municipality is a net importer of workers, with about 2.0 workers entering the municipality for every one leaving. Of the working population, 35.9% used public transportation to get to work, and 41.1% used a private car.

== Religion ==
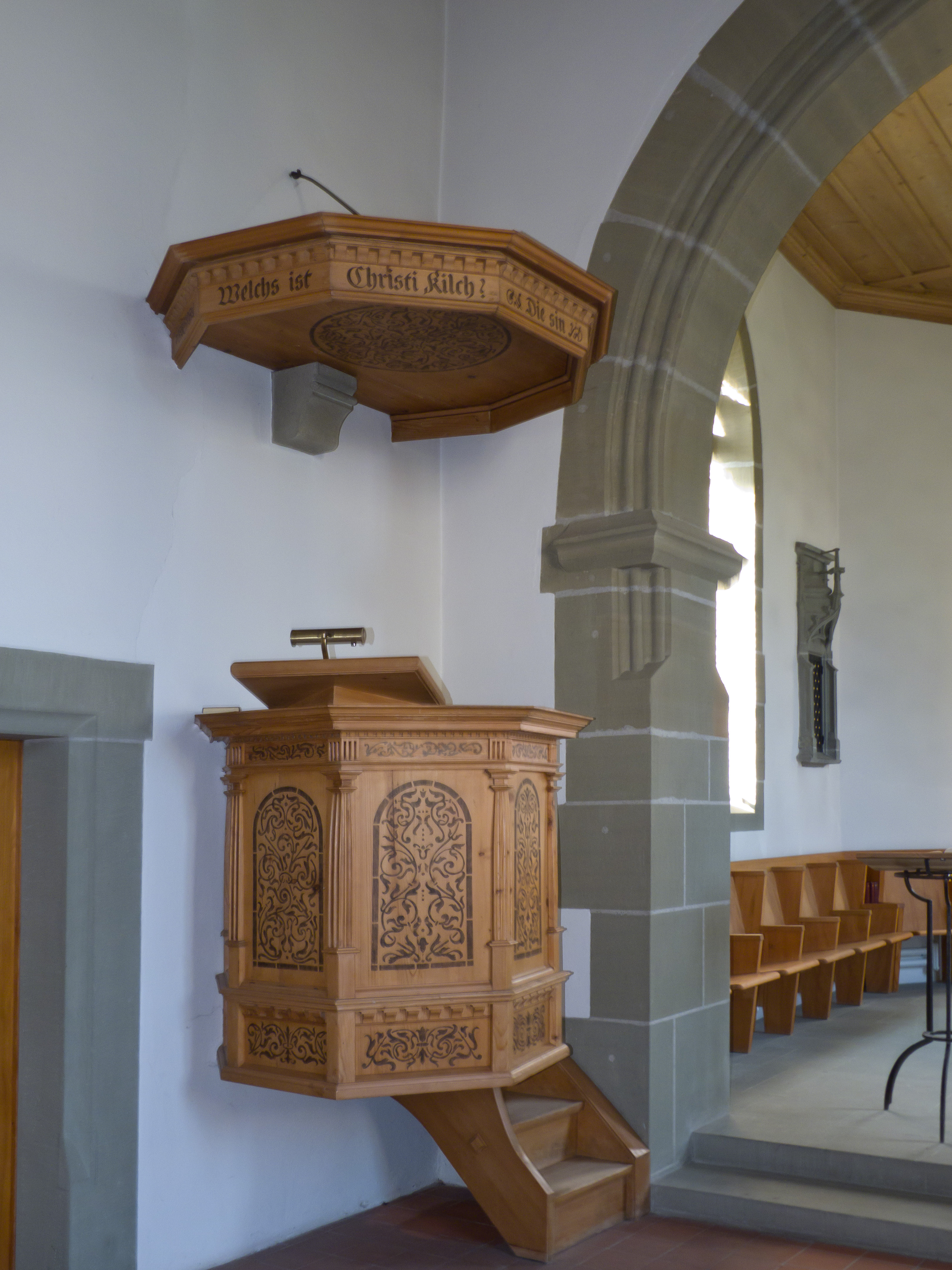
Interior of the Swiss Reformed Moosseedorf church

From the 2000 census, 606 or 16.9% were Roman Catholic, while 2,249 or 62.8% belonged to the Swiss Reformed Church. Of the rest of the population, there were 36 members of an Orthodox church (or about 1.00% of the population), there were 4 individuals (or about 0.11% of the population) who belonged to the Christian Catholic Church, and there were 224 individuals (or about 6.25% of the population) who belonged to another Christian church. There were 120 (or about 3.35% of the population) who were Islamic. There were 26 individuals who were Buddhist, 53 individuals who were Hindu and 6 individuals who belonged to another church. 261 (or about 7.28% of the population) belonged to no church, are agnostic or atheist, and 110 individuals (or about 3.07% of the population) did not answer the question.

== Education ==
In Moosseedorf about 1,543 or (43.1%) of the population have completed non-mandatory upper secondary education, and 396 or (11.0%) have completed additional higher education (either university or a Fachhochschule). Of the 396 who completed tertiary schooling, 69.9% were Swiss men, 21.7% were Swiss women, 5.3% were non-Swiss men and 3.0% were non-Swiss women.

The Canton of Bern school system provides one year of non-obligatory Kindergarten, followed by six years of Primary school. This is followed by three years of obligatory lower Secondary school where the students are separated according to ability and aptitude. Following the lower Secondary students may attend additional schooling or they may enter an apprenticeship.

During the 2010–11 school year, there were a total of 355 students attending classes in Moosseedorf. There were 4 kindergarten classes with a total of 70 students in the municipality. Of the kindergarten students, 24.3% were permanent or temporary residents of Switzerland (not citizens) and 30.0% have a different mother language than the classroom language. The municipality had 9 primary classes and 188 students. Of the primary students, 22.3% were permanent or temporary residents of Switzerland (not citizens) and 32.4% have a different mother language than the classroom language. During the same year, there were 6 lower secondary classes with a total of 97 students. There were 18.6% who were permanent or temporary residents of Switzerland (not citizens) and 29.9% have a different mother language than the classroom language.

As of 2000, there were 148 students in Moosseedorf who came from another municipality, while 142 residents attended schools outside the municipality.
