= Deisswil bei Münchenbuchsee =

Municipality in Bern, Switzerland

- Municipality
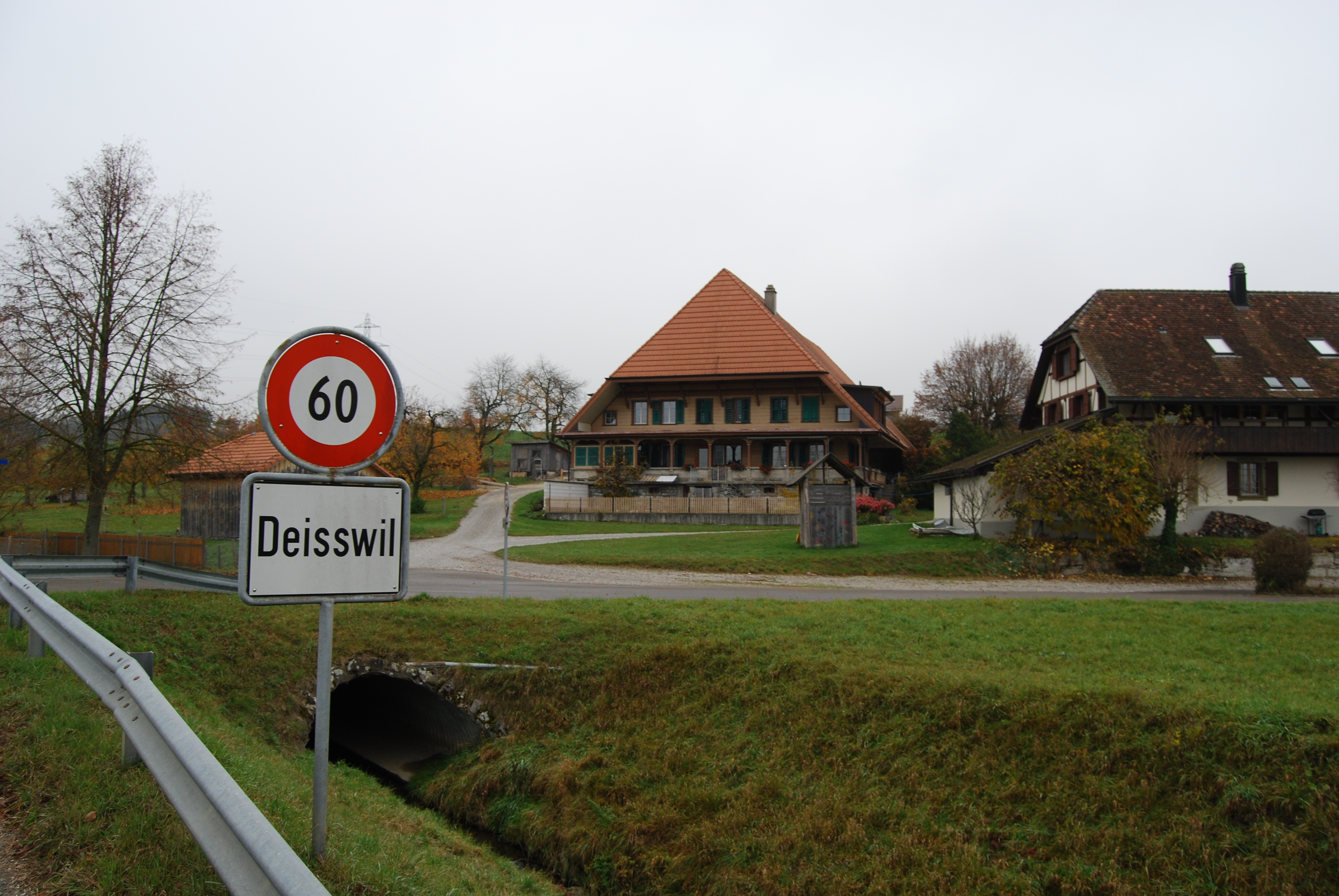
- Deisswil bei Münchenbuchsee village

- Flag Coat of arms
- Location of Deisswil bei Münchenbuchsee
- Location within Switzerland Location within Canton of Bern
- Coordinates: 47°2′N 7°27′E
- Country: Switzerland
- Canton: Bern
- District: Bern-Mittelland

Government
  - Executive: Gemeinderat with 5 members
  - Mayor: Gemeindepräsident; Theo Bühlmann (as of 2026)

Area
  - Total: 2.1 km^{2} (0.81 sq mi)
- Elevation: 530 m (1,740 ft)

Population (December 2020)
  - Total: 86
  - Density: 41/km^{2} (110/sq mi)
- Time zone: UTC+01:00 (CET)
  - Summer (DST): UTC+02:00 (CEST)
- Postal code: 3053
- SFOS number: 535
- ISO 3166 code: CH-BE
- Surrounded by: Ballmoos, Münchenbuchsee, Rapperswil, Wiggiswil, Zuzwil
- Website: https://www.deisswil.ch/

Deisswil bei Münchenbuchsee is a municipality in the Bern-Mittelland administrative district in the canton of Bern in Switzerland.

== History ==
Deisswil bei Münchenbuchsee is first mentioned in 1263 as Teiswile.

Some Roman era bricks and what might be a Roman road were discovered in a meadow outside the village. During the Middle Ages it was part of the court, parish and Commandry of Münchenbuchsee. In 1528, after the Commandery was secularized, the village became part of the Bernese district of Münchenbuchsee. In 1803 it became part of the Fraubrunnen district.

Deisswil and Wiggiswil formed a single school district in 1802 and have continued sharing a school since that time. Between 1832 and 1847 the two villages were combined into a single political municipality. The border between the two municipalities was finally, after centuries of conflict, determined in 1882. The village has remained rural and the only industry in the village is a gravel pit.

== Geography ==
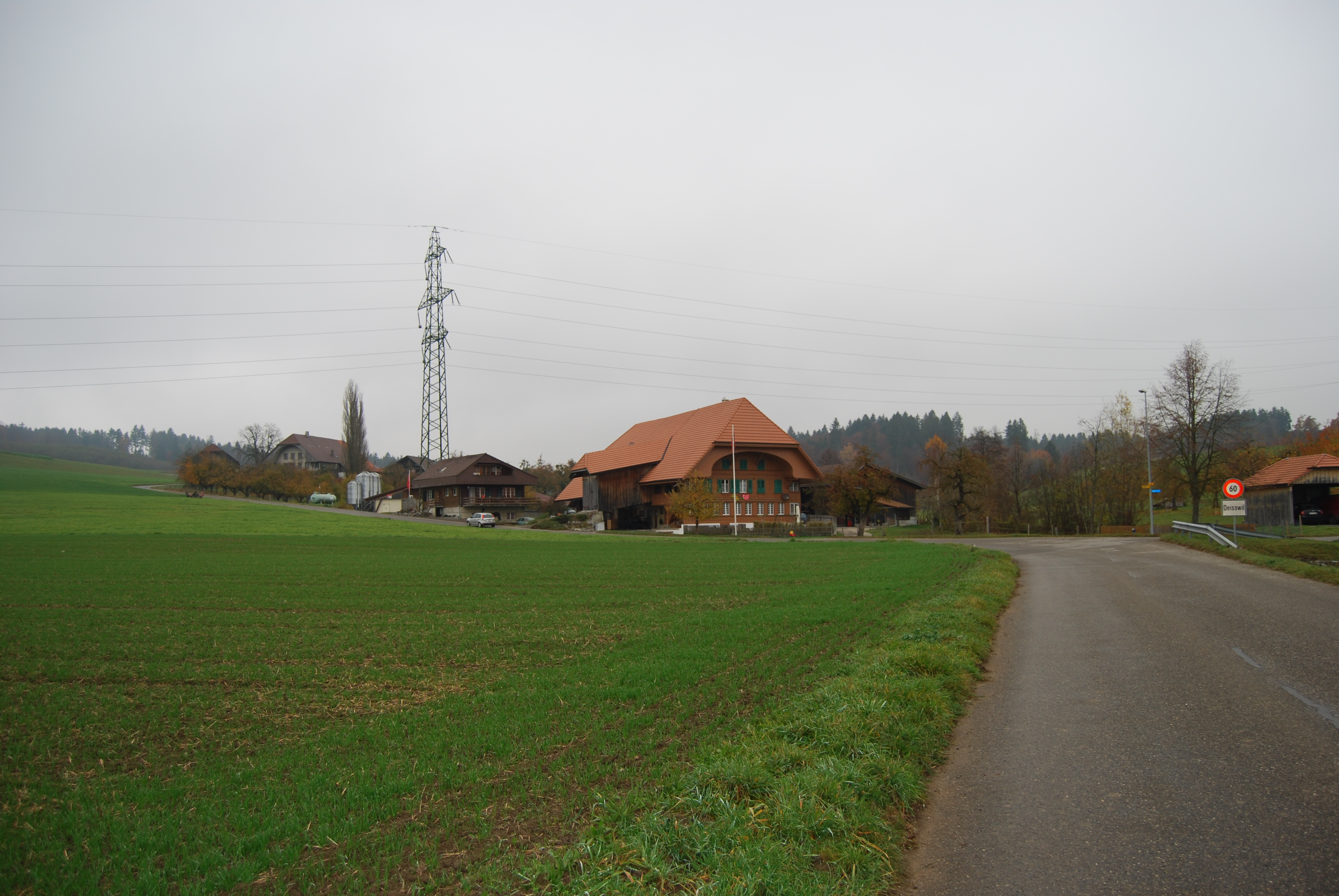
Farm houses and fields in Diesswil

Deisswil bei Münchenbuchsee has an area of 2.16 km^{2} (0.83 sq mi). Of this area, 1.29 km^{2} (0.50 mi^{2}) or 60.0% is used for agricultural purposes, while 0.54 km^{2} (0.21 mi^{2}) or 25.1% is forested. Of the rest of the land, 0.3 km^{2} (0.12 mi^{2}) or 14.0% is settled (buildings or roads).

Of the built up area, housing and buildings made up 2.3% and transportation infrastructure made up 5.6%. Power and water infrastructure as well as other special developed areas made up 5.6% of the area Out of the forested land, all of the forested land area is covered with heavy forests. Of the agricultural land, 46.0% is used for growing crops and 13.0% is pastures.

Deisswil bei Münchenbuchsee is a Straßendorf (a village that lies almost entirely along a single road) with a few individual farms located on the north west of Moos Lake. It belongs to the parish and the greater community (Gemeindeverband) of Münchenbuchsee.

On 31 December 2009 Amtsbezirk Fraubrunnen, the municipality's former district, was dissolved. On the following day, 1 January 2010, it joined the newly created Verwaltungskreis Bern-Mittelland.

== Coat of arms ==
The blazon of the municipal coat of arms is Per fess Gules a Semi Mill Wheel issuant Or and Argent.

== Demographics ==
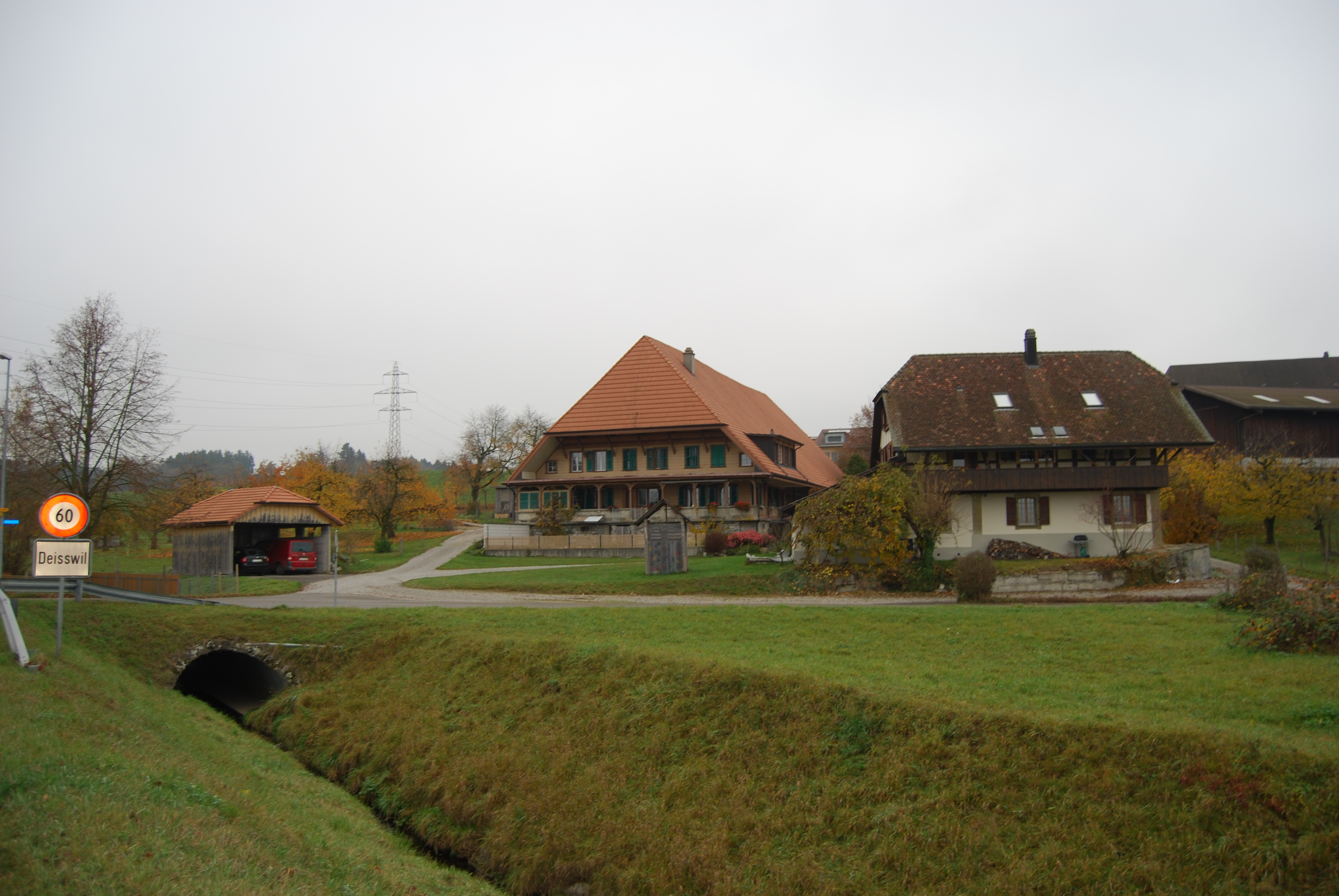
Deisswil bei Münchenbuchsee

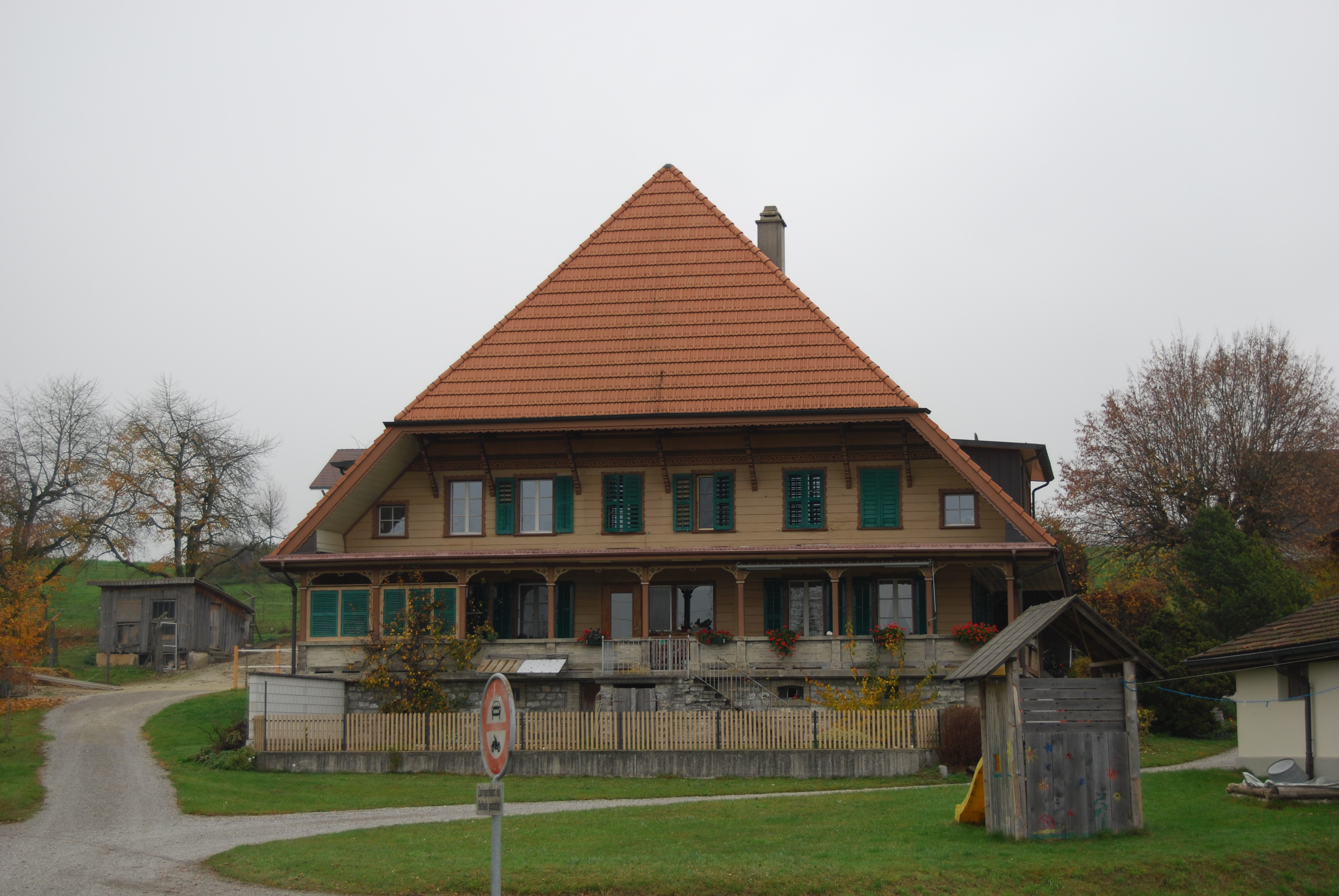
Large farm house in Diesswil

Deisswil bei Münchenbuchsee has a population (as of December 2020) of 86. As of 2010, 1.0% of the population are resident foreign nationals. Over the last 10 years (2000-2010) the population has changed at a rate of 15.7%. Migration accounted for 7.2%, while births and deaths accounted for 7.2%. Most of the population (as of 2000) speaks German (86 or 98.9%) as their first language with the rest speaking Serbo-Croatian.

As of 2008, the population was 49.0% male and 51.0% female. The population was made up of 46 Swiss men (47.9% of the population) and 1 (1.0%) non-Swiss men. There were 49 Swiss women (51.0%) and (0.0%) non-Swiss women. Of the population in the municipality, 28 or about 32.2% were born in Deisswil bei Münchenbuchsee and lived there in 2000. There were 40 or 46.0% who were born in the same canton, while 12 or 13.8% were born somewhere else in Switzerland, and 2 or 2.3% were born outside of Switzerland.

As of 2010, children and teenagers (0–19 years old) make up 20.8% of the population, while adults (20–64 years old) make up 64.6% and seniors (over 64 years old) make up 14.6%.

As of 2000, there were 44 people who were single and never married in the municipality. There were 30 married individuals, 8 widows or widowers and 5 individuals who are divorced.

As of 2000, there were 11 households that consist of only one person and 3 households with five or more people. In 2000, a total of 30 apartments (88.2% of the total) were permanently occupied, while 4 apartments (11.8%) were seasonally occupied. As of 2010, the construction rate of new housing units was 20.8 new units per 1000 residents. The vacancy rate for the municipality, in 2011, was 2.38%.

The historical population is given in the following chart:

== Sights ==
The entire hamlet of Deisswil bei Münchenbuchsee is designated as part of the Inventory of Swiss Heritage Sites.

== Politics ==
In the 2011 federal election the most popular party was the Federal Democratic Union of Switzerland (EDU) which received 6% of the vote. The next three most popular parties were the Liberal Party of Switzerland (LPS) (0%), the Swiss Democrats (SD) (0%) and the Freedom Party of Switzerland (Lega) (0%).

== Economy ==
As of 2011, Deisswil bei Münchenbuchsee had an unemployment rate of 0.65%. As of 2008, there were a total of 121 people employed in the municipality. Of these, there were 20 people employed in the primary economic sector and about 6 businesses involved in this sector. 101 people were employed in the secondary sector and there were 2 businesses in this sector. There were 50 residents of the municipality who were employed in some capacity, of which females made up 42.0% of the workforce.

In 2008 there were a total of 108 full-time equivalent jobs. The number of jobs in the primary sector was 13, all of which were in agriculture. The number of jobs in the secondary sector was 95 of which 87 or (91.6%) were in manufacturing, 8 or (8.4%) were in mining.

In 2000, there were 12 workers who commuted into the municipality and 36 workers who commuted away. The municipality is a net exporter of workers, with about 3.0 workers leaving the municipality for every one entering. Of the working population, 14% used public transportation to get to work, and 54% used a private car.

== Religion ==
From the 2000 census, 3 or 3.4% were Roman Catholic, while 82 or 94.3% belonged to the Swiss Reformed Church. 2 (or about 2.30% of the population) belonged to no church, are agnostic or atheist.

== Education ==
In Deisswil bei Münchenbuchsee about 34 or (39.1%) of the population have completed non-mandatory upper secondary education, and 15 or (17.2%) have completed additional higher education (either university or a Fachhochschule). Of the 15 who completed tertiary schooling, 66.7% were Swiss men, 33.3% were Swiss women.
