= Ballmoos =

- Former municipality
- Flag Coat of arms
- Location of Ballmoos
- Location within Switzerland Location within Canton of Bern
- Coordinates: 47°2′N 7°28′E
- Country: Switzerland
- Canton: Bern
- District: Fraubrunnen

Area
  - Total: 1.5 km^{2} (0.58 sq mi)
- Elevation: 567 m (1,860 ft)

Population (December 2007)
  - Total: 55
  - Density: 37/km^{2} (95/sq mi)
- Time zone: UTC+01:00 (CET)
  - Summer (DST): UTC+02:00 (CEST)
- Postal code: 3303
- SFOS number: 531
- ISO 3166 code: CH-BE
- Surrounded by: Deisswil bei Münchenbuchsee, Jegenstorf, Urtenen-Schönbühl, Wiggiswil, Zuzwil
- Website: SFSO statistics

Ballmoos was a municipality in the district of Fraubrunnen, in the canton of Bern in Switzerland. On 1 January 2010, the municipality of Ballmoos merged with the municipality of Jegenstorf.

== History ==
Ballmoos is first mentioned in 1270 as Banemos. Several Bronze Age artifacts have been found in the area, but there is no evidence of a settlement. A family of Ministerialis, unfree knights who served the House of Kyburg, originated from Ballmoos. The major land owner was the Order of St. John in Münchenbuchsee. Following the secularization of the monasteries (1528), Ballmoos became part of the Landvogtei of Münchenbuchsee. Following the Act of Mediation in 1803, it became part of the District of Fraubrunnen.

== Geography ==
Ballmoos has an area of 1.5 km^{2} (0.58 sq mi). Of this area, 73.5% is used for agricultural purposes, while 22.4% is forested. Of the rest of the land, 3.4% is settled (buildings or roads) and the remainder (0.7%) is non-productive (rivers or glaciers).

Ballmoos consists entirely of individual houses scattered throughout the borders of the municipality.

== Demographics ==
Ballmoos has a population (as of 2007) of 55, all Swiss citizens. Over the last 10 years the population has decreased at a rate of -3.5%. Most of the population (as of 2000) speaks German (98.4%), with the rest speaking French.

In the 2007 election the most popular party was the SVP which received 58% of the vote. The next three most popular parties were the SPS (20.7%), the Green Party (13.7%) and the CVP (1.6%).

The age distribution of the population (as of 2000) is children and teenagers (0–19 years old) make up 39.3% of the population, while adults (20–64 years old) make up 41% and seniors (over 64 years old) make up 19.7%. In Ballmoos about 60% of the population (between age 25–64) have completed either non-mandatory upper secondary education or additional higher education (either University or a Fachhochschule).

Ballmoos has an unemployment rate of 12%. As of 2005, there no one employed in the primary economic sector. 1 person is employed in the secondary sector and there is 1 business in this sector. 4 people are employed in the tertiary sector, with no businesses in this sector.

The historical population is given in the following table:

year	population
1764	27
1850	45
1900	78
1950	59
1990	56
