= Münchenbuchsee Commandery =

Medieval commandery in the Swiss municipality of Münchenbuchsee

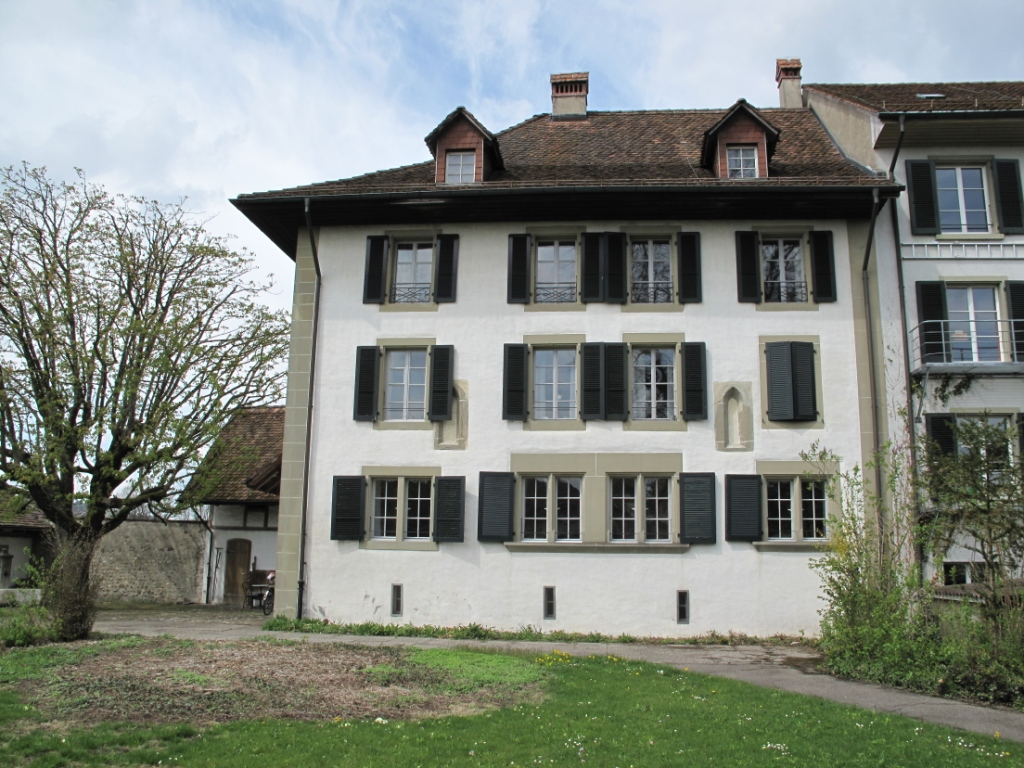
Münchenbuchsee Commandery building

The Münchenbuchsee Commandery was a medieval commandery of the Knights Hospitaller in the Swiss municipality of Münchenbuchsee in the Canton of Bern.

== History ==
During the 12th century, the area around Münchenbuchsee was part of the lands of the Baron of Buhse. In 1180, Cuno of Buhse or Buchsee granted all of his lands to the Order of St. John, also known as the Knights Hospitaller. This land grant included the villages of Münchenbuchsee, Wankdorf and Worblaufen as well as vineyards on Lake Biel. In 1192, the Pope confirmed this gift on the knights. Shortly thereafter it was converted into a commandery under the Order. The neighboring nobility and the citizens of Bern granted the commandery additional lands. This included the church at Twann (1252), Moosseedorf (1256), Krauchthal (1273), Bremgarten (1306), Wohlen (1320), the castle, court and village of Moosseedorf (1256–57) and the district of Bremgarten (1306). The commandery had its own seal by 1264. Bern granted the commandery limited rights of citizenship in 1329.

Originally the commandery was surrounded by a wall, though this was eventually demolished. The south side of the complex contained the courtyard of the oldest part of Cuno's castle, the monastery (housing for the knights), the commander's house and a church. The church's choir was built in 1260-80 and the stained glass is from the 13th century. The current church tower was built in 1891. On the north side of the complex there was a summer house, a guesthouse and workshops.

The monastic community was always quite small. In 1480, only the commander, the prior and six knights lived there. In keeping with the Rule of Life of the Order, the knights at the commandery were responsible for providing pastoral care to the people of the area, operating a pilgrims' hospital and caring for the poor. The commander of Münchenbuchsee often was also appointed the head of the Thunstetten Commandery.

At the start of the Protestant Reformation in Switzerland in 1528, Commander Peter Englisberg, who headed both houses, supported the secularization of the two commanderies, for which he received Bremgarten Castle as a reward. The commander's house became a rectory, the monastery and outbuildings became a granary and the remaining buildings were used to administer the bailiwick of Münchenbuchsee. On the north side a bailiff's castle and tithe barn were built in 1600-20, on the site of a medieval building.
