= Ricco (painter) =

Swiss painter

- Born: Erich Wassmer; 13 October 1915; Allschwil, Switzerland
- Died: 27 March 1972 (aged 56); Ropraz, Switzerland
- Education: Cuno Amiet
- Known for: Painting
- Notable work: Dîner au château (c. 1934); Pereoo Faraoa (c. 1948); Saint-Pourçain (c. 1951); Le cadre (c. 1954); Le beau cheval (c. 1966)
- Movement: Magic realism

Ricco (October 13, 1915 – March 27, 1972), born Erich Wassmer, was a Swiss painter. His paintings often depict idealizing dream worlds in the genre of magic realism.

== Life ==
Erich Wassmer was born in Allschwil into an upper-class environment, the son of cement factory owner and art patron Max Wassmer (1887–1970). From the age of 3 he grew up at Bremgarten Castle near Bern, which was filled with art and culture. Max and Tilli-Wassmer-Zurlinden socialised with poets, painters and composers such as Hermann Hesse, Louis Moilliet, Cuno Amiet, Paul Basilius Barth and Othmar Schoeck. Early on Erich Wassmer was interested in the art of painting. The family encouraged his artistic talent and his interest in art, literature and music, after the continuation of the parental cement factory had been secured by his two brothers. Wassmer marked the end of his childhood with a new name: From 1937 onwards Erich Wassmer signed his paintings with Ricco — a name like a magic word — instead of the name of his well-known industrialist and philanthropist father. Ricco studied at the Ludwig-Maximilians-Universität München in Munich and the Académie Ranson in Paris, and was taught by Cuno Amiet. However, the influence of his teachers remained marginal. Ricco was fascinated by the sea, as well as by the desire to explore lost paradises and undiscovered territories. He had the symbol of an anchor tattooed on his arm and added this symbol henceforth to his signature on his paintings. During the forties, he crossed the ocean on a freighter, and lived for a while in Tahiti. In the fifties he settled at Bompré Castle near Vichy. In 1963, the French police discovered in his studio photos of nude boys who served as the basis for his paintings. A French court convicted him — without a formal indictment — of sexual "exploitation" of young boys and breach of the morality to eight-months in prison. Ricco never recovered completely from this prison sentence. Following his release, Ricco returned to Switzerland and settled in a mansion in Ropraz. He died there in 1972 at the age of 56. Until his death Ricco Wassmer remained a family shareholder in the Portland-Cement-Werke AG.

== Work ==
Ricco's early work (e.g. his paintings of castle life) can be classified as primitivist, while his mature work includes still lifes, harbor scenes, exotic motifs and allegorical figures. He often painted dream worlds in the style of magic realism with lean boys surrounded by surreal arrangements. Ricco's paintings reveal his longing for a state of androgynous, youthful perfection. Ricco's work "is anchored in everyday reality, but has overtones of fantasy or wonder" creating a surreal atmosphere.

== Exhibitions ==
- 1953 Kunsthalle Bern
- 1969 Kunsthalle Bern
- 1988 Aargauer Kunsthaus
- 2002/2003 Museum of Fine Arts Bern
- 2008 Fondation l'Estrée
- 2009 Museum of Fine Arts Bern
- 2015/2016 Museum of Fine Arts Bern
