= Moossee =

Lake in the canton of Bern, Switzerland

- Grosser Moossee
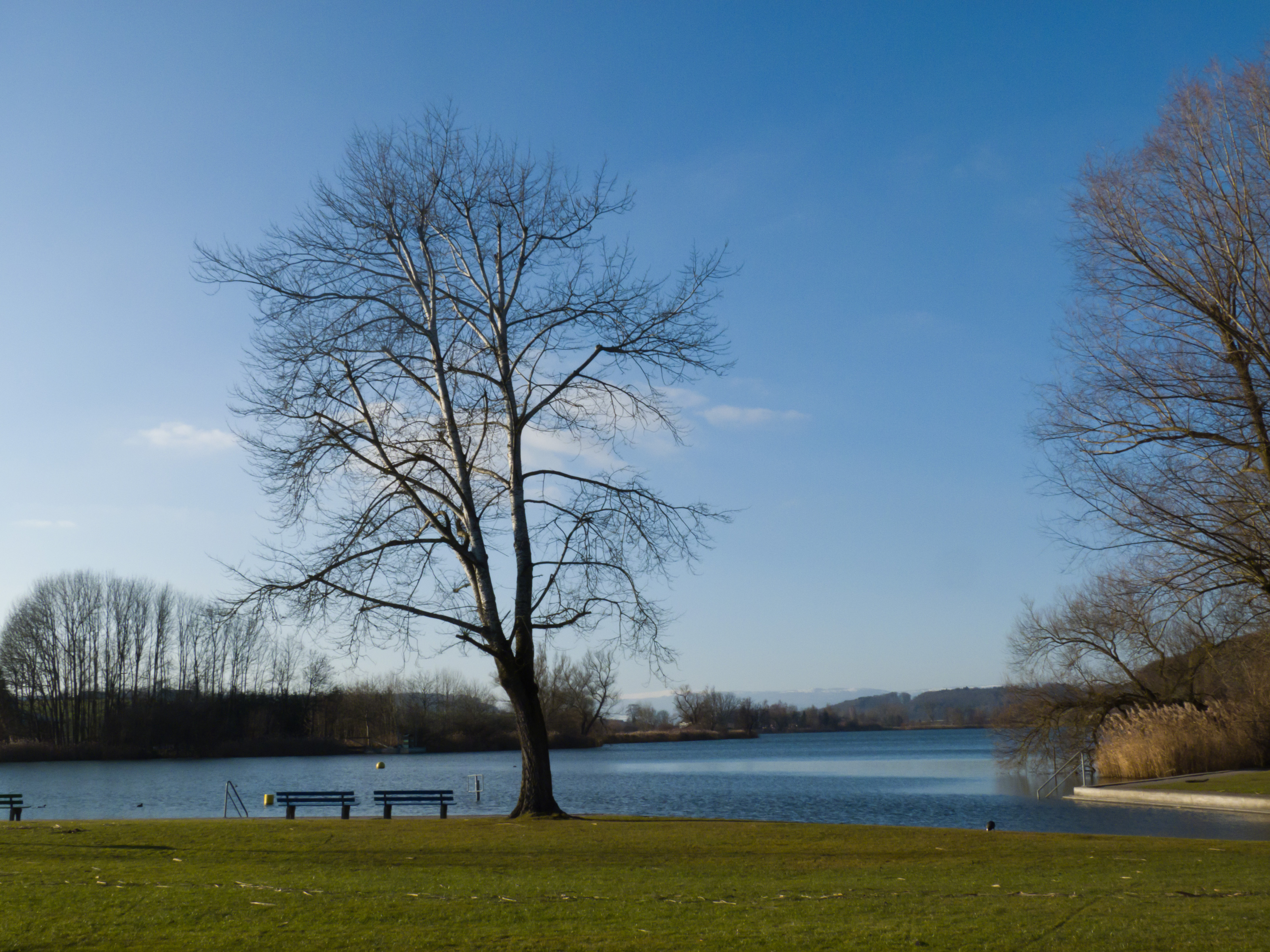
- The Moossee at the bath area

- Location within Canton of Bern Location within Switzerland Location within Alps
- Interactive map of Moossee
- Location: Canton of Bern
- Coordinates: 47°1′19″N 7°28′49″E
- Primary inflows: Urtenen
- Primary outflows: Urtenen
- Catchment area: 20.8 km^{2} (8.0 sq mi)
- Basin countries: Switzerland
- Surface area: 31 ha (77 acres)
- Max. depth: 21.1 m (69 ft)
- Surface elevation: 521 m (1,709 ft)
- Settlements: Moosseedorf

Moossee (or Grosser Moossee) is a lake in the canton of Bern, Switzerland. Its surface area is 31 ha (77 acres). The lake gives the name to Moosseedorf (literally "village of Moossee") on its southern shore. The golf course Moossee is located east of the lake at Münchenbuchsee. The Urtenen drains Chli Moossee before flowing into Grosser Moossee 400 m further.

== See also ==
- List of lakes of Switzerland
