= A6 motorway (Switzerland) =

Autobahn in Switzerland

A6

- Location of the A6 in Switzerland

Route information
- Length: 71 km (44 mi)

Major junctions
- To: Mülenen

Location
- Country: Switzerland

Highway system
- Transport in Switzerland; Motorways

The A6 motorway, an Autobahn in Switzerland, connects Biel / Bienne over Bern with Mülenen. The A6 is located entirely within the Canton of Bern and, in particular, has a great regional significance, as only the section of Bern in the direction Berner Oberland is part of the Swiss national road system.

== History ==
From 2024 to 2027, the A6 highway between Thun-Süd and Spiez is being upgraded and renovated.

== Route ==
The A6 is a Swiss motorway. Up until the mid-1990s it was called N6. This denomination is still used in certain documents. The A6 has two sections. the first section starts in Biel / Bienne and goes to Schönbühl. This section is a cantonal road belonging to the canton of Bern, but in 2014 it will be taken over by the Swiss government and thus turn into a national road. In Schönbühl the A6 joins the A1.

A few kilometers south, at the junction Bern-Wankdorf, the two motorways separate again. The A6 leads up the Aare valley to Thun, and from there to the junction of Lattigen near Spiez. At this junction, the A6 turns south to Mülenen while the motorway going southeast changes into the A8.

Earlier, there had been plans to continue the national road through the Simmental and then connect it with the Canton of Valais through the Rawil-Tunnel, but this project was abandoned in 1984. The road and the tunnel were never built.

== Junction list ==
Junctions

A5	planned
Autostrasse A6
(1)	Fork Brüggmoos A5 - planned
(2)	Port
(3)	Brügg
(4)	Studen (BE)
Autostrasse A6
	Motorway end
(5)	Lyss Nord
(6)	Lyss Süd
(7)	Schüpfen
(8)	Münchenbuchsee
(9)	Schönbühl
(10)	Fork Schönbühl A1
	Grauholz
(11)	Fork Bern Wankdorf A1
(11)	Bern Wankdorf
(12)	Bern Ostring
	Sonnenhof (280 m)
(13)	Muri A10
(14)	Rubigen
	(Raststätte) Münsingen
(15)	Kiesen
(16)	Thun Nord
	Allmend (960 m)
(17)	Thun Süd
(18)	Fork Lattigen A8
A8

Autobahnzweig A6b

A6
(1)	Fork Lattigen A8
(2)	Wimmis
Motorway end
Autostrasse A6b
Simmeflue Tunnel
(3)	Wimmis Port
Autostrasse A6b
Hauptstrasse 11
