= Neubrügg =

Covered wooden bridge over the river Aare

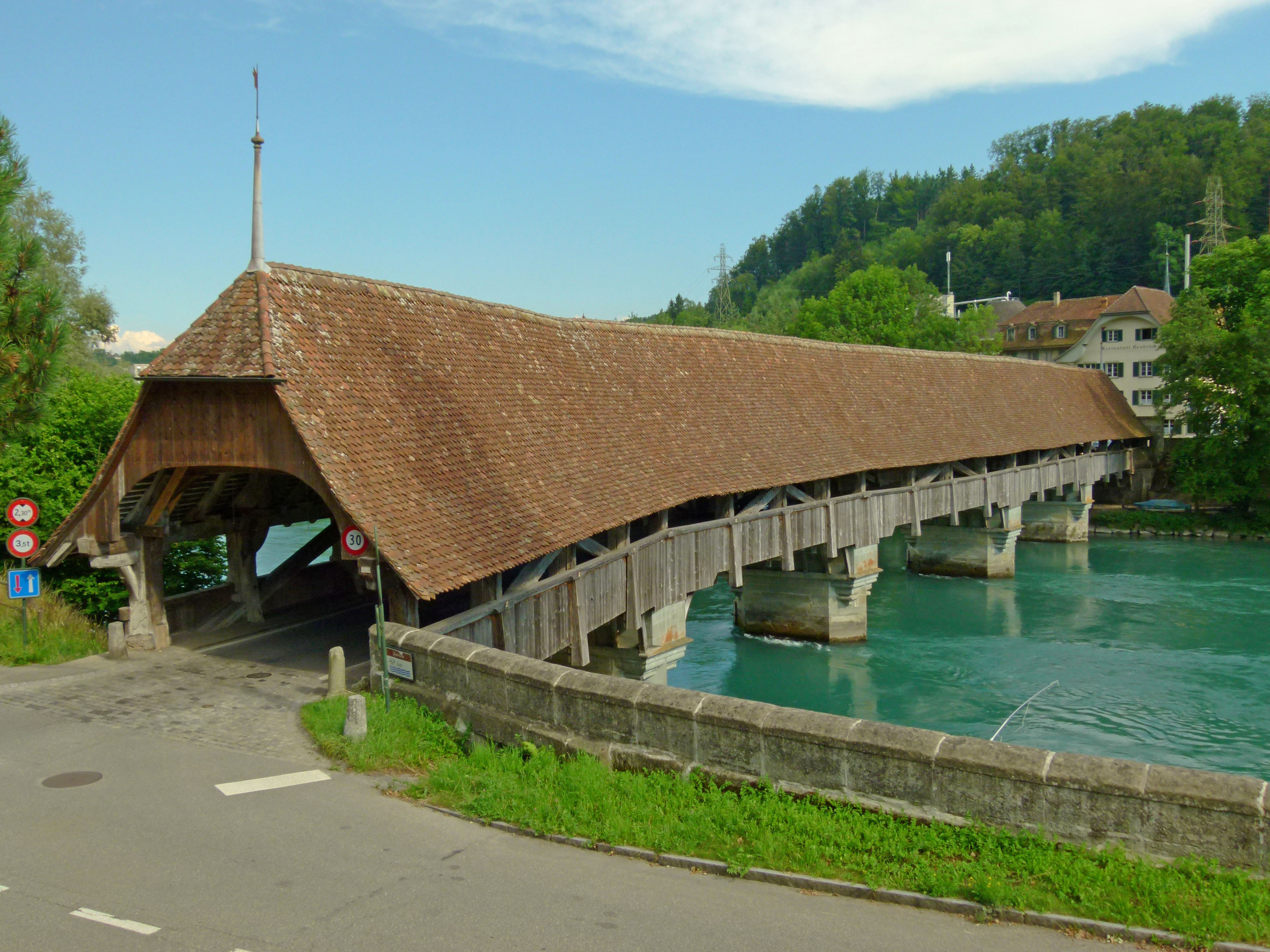
- The Neubrügg
- Coordinates: 46°58′26″N 7°25′41″E
- Carries: Pedestrians
- Crosses: Aare
- Locale: Bern and Kirchlindach, Switzerland
- ID number: 10503

Characteristics
- Material: Wooden

History
- Construction start: 1469

The Neubrügg or Neubrücke (English: New Bridge) is a covered wooden bridge over the river Aare between the village of Kirchlindach and Bern in the canton of Bern in Switzerland. It is a Swiss heritage site of national significance.

== History ==
The bridge was first built in 1469 to replace a ferry crossing over the Aare. The bridge eventually became part of two major roads that helped Bern control its extensive territory north of the river. The road into the Berner Seeland passed over the bridge before traveling to Meikirch, while the other road ran into the Fraubrunnenamt after passing through Oberlindach and Münchenbuchsee. The Neubrügg remained important until motorized traffic made it obsolete. It was supplanted by the concrete Halenbrücke in 1911-13.

== See also ==
- List of Aare bridges in Bern
