= Schüpfen =

- Municipality
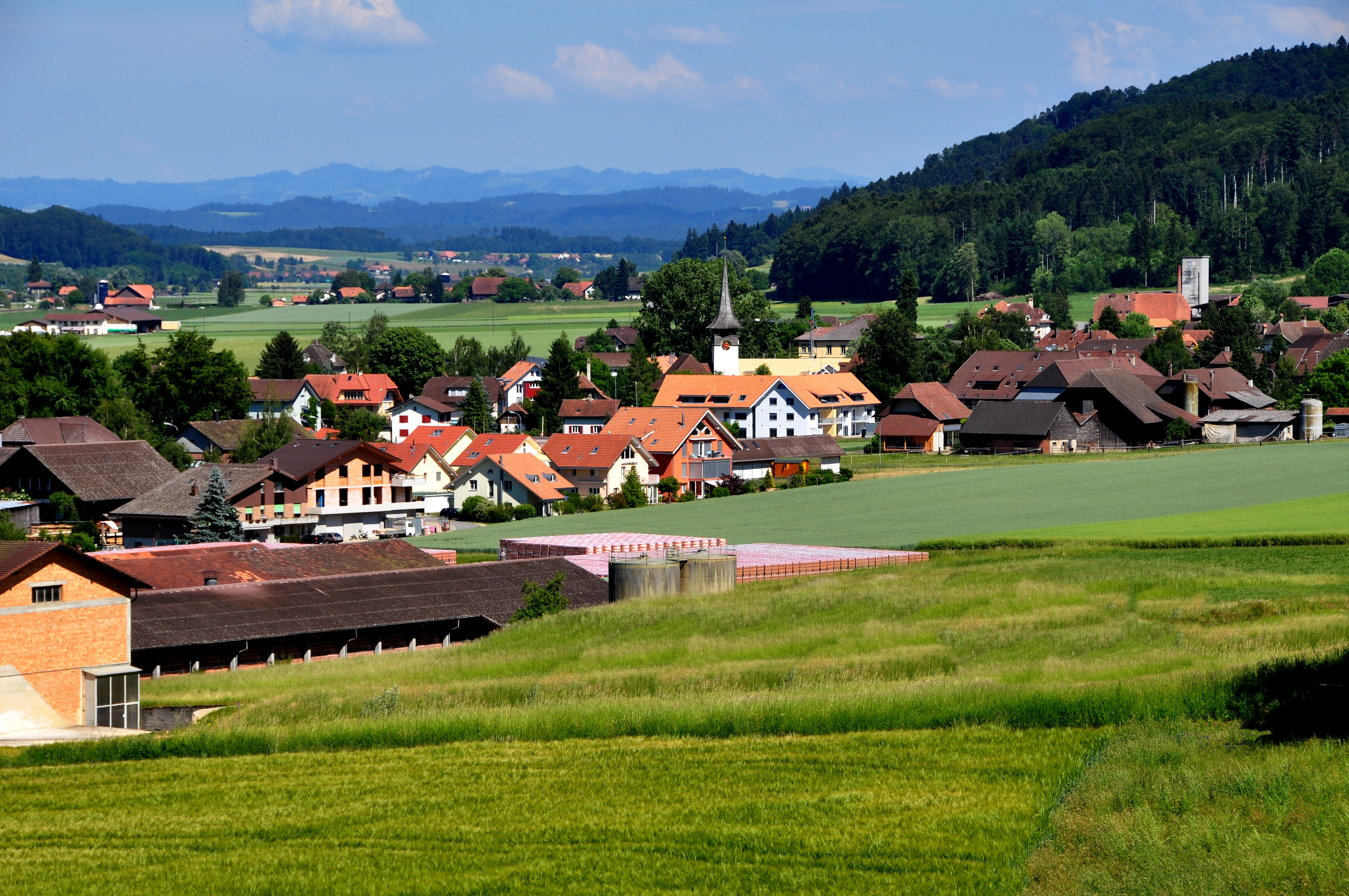
- Schüpfen, village from southwest

- Flag Coat of arms
- Location of Schüpfen
- Location within Switzerland Location within Canton of Bern
- Coordinates: 47°2′N 7°23′E
- Country: Switzerland
- Canton: Bern
- District: Seeland

Government
  - Mayor: Ueli Hunziker

Area
  - Total: 19.83 km^{2} (7.66 sq mi)
- Elevation: 629 m (2,064 ft)

Population (December 2020)
  - Total: 3,792
  - Density: 191.2/km^{2} (495.3/sq mi)
- Time zone: UTC+01:00 (CET)
  - Summer (DST): UTC+02:00 (CEST)
- Postal code: 3054
- SFOS number: 311
- ISO 3166 code: CH-BE
- Surrounded by: Diemerswil, Grossaffoltern, Kirchlindach, Meikirch, Münchenbuchsee, Rapperswil, Seedorf
- Website: www.schuepfen.ch

Schüpfen is a municipality in the Seeland administrative district in the canton of Bern in Switzerland.

== History ==
Schüpfen is first mentioned in 1208 as Scuphon.

Prehistoric traces of a settlement in the area include Mesolithic and Bronze Age artifacts, along with Hallstatt and La Tene grave mounds. The area remained inhabited during the Roman era and Early Middle Ages. The Ministerialis (unfree knights in the service of a feudal overlord) family of Schüpfen ruled the village for the Zähringens and Kyburgs from 1208 until 1405. Schüpfen was a center of local administration for several surrounding communities. In 1405, the Lords of Mattstetten inherited Schüpfen from the Schüpfen family. They then donated the village and surrounding lands to the Hospitallers at Münchenbuchsee Commandery. During the 14th century, Frienisberg Abbey bought much of the property in the village. After the secularization of the Abbey in 1528, the village became part of the Bernese bailiwick of Frienisberg. After the 1798 French invasion, it became part of the District of Zollikofen under the Helvetic Republic. After the Act of Mediation in 1803, it was transferred to the Aarberg District.

The village church was first mentioned in 1268 and was rebuilt in 1741-42, though the new building retained the medieval bell tower.

The local economy has traditionally relied heavily on agriculture, though around 1850 many farms shifted to cattle and dairy production. Currently agriculture remains important in the surrounding hamlets and villages, while Schüpfen is a center of trade and light industry. The Bern-Biel cantonal road was first built in 1835-44 and connected Schüpfen to larger towns. This first large road was supplemented by a railroad in 1864 and a highway in 1983. The good transportation links allowed Schüpfen residents to easily commute to Bern, Biel and Lyss for work or school. In the 1970s new housing developments for the growing number of commuters grew up along the major roads and railway.

== Geography ==
Aerial view (1954)

Schüpfen has an area of 19.84 km^{2} (7.66 sq mi). Of this area, 11.05 km^{2} (4.27 mi^{2}) or 55.7% is used for agricultural purposes, while 6.52 km^{2} (2.52 mi^{2}) or 32.9% is forested. Of the rest of the land, 2.13 km^{2} (0.82 mi^{2}) or 10.7% is settled (buildings or roads), 0.08 km^{2} (20 acres) or 0.4% is either rivers or lakes and 0.02 km^{2} (4.9 acres) or 0.1% is unproductive land.

Of the built up area, housing and buildings made up 4.7% and transportation infrastructure made up 4.4%. Out of the forested land, all of the forested land area is covered with heavy forests. Of the agricultural land, 42.9% is used for growing crops and 11.7% is pastures, while 1.1% is used for orchards or vine crops. All the water in the municipality is flowing water.

The municipality is located in the Lyssbach valley and on the Frienisberg and Rapperswil plateaus. It consists of the villages of Schüpfen, Bundkofen, Schwanden, Ziegelried, Saurenhorn, Schüpberg, Allenschwil, Wintersschwil and Bütschwil as well as scattered farm houses.

== Coat of arms ==
The blazon of the municipal coat of arms is Gules three Wings Argent, two addorsed and third in fess.

== Demographics ==
Schüpfen has a population (as of December 2020) of 3,792. As of 2010, 6.5% of the population are resident foreign nationals. Over the last 10 years (2000–2010) the population has changed at a rate of 3.9%. Migration accounted for 0.1%, while births and deaths accounted for 2.3%.

Most of the population (as of 2000) speaks German (3,142 or 94.7%) as their first language, French is the second most common (36 or 1.1%) and Spanish is the third (30 or 0.9%). There are 21 people who speak Italian and 1 person who speaks Romansh.

As of 2008, the population was 49.2% male and 50.8% female. The population was made up of 1,538 Swiss men (45.1% of the population) and 137 (4.0%) non-Swiss men. There were 1,648 Swiss women (48.4%) and 84 (2.5%) non-Swiss women. Of the population in the municipality, 962 or about 29.0% were born in Schüpfen and lived there in 2000. There were 1,518 or 45.8% who were born in the same canton, while 496 or 14.9% were born somewhere else in Switzerland, and 240 or 7.2% were born outside of Switzerland.

As of 2010, children and teenagers (0–19 years old) make up 21.3% of the population, while adults (20–64 years old) make up 63.5% and seniors (over 64 years old) make up 15.1%.

As of 2000, there were 1,438 people who were single and never married in the municipality. There were 1,577 married individuals, 163 widows or widowers and 140 individuals who are divorced.

As of 2000, there were 338 households that consist of only one person and 91 households with five or more people. In 2000, a total of 1,247 apartments (92.2% of the total) were permanently occupied, while 58 apartments (4.3%) were seasonally occupied and 48 apartments (3.5%) were empty. As of 2010, the construction rate of new housing units was 0.3 new units per 1000 residents. The vacancy rate for the municipality, in 2011, was 0.69%.

The historical population is given in the following chart:

== Sights ==
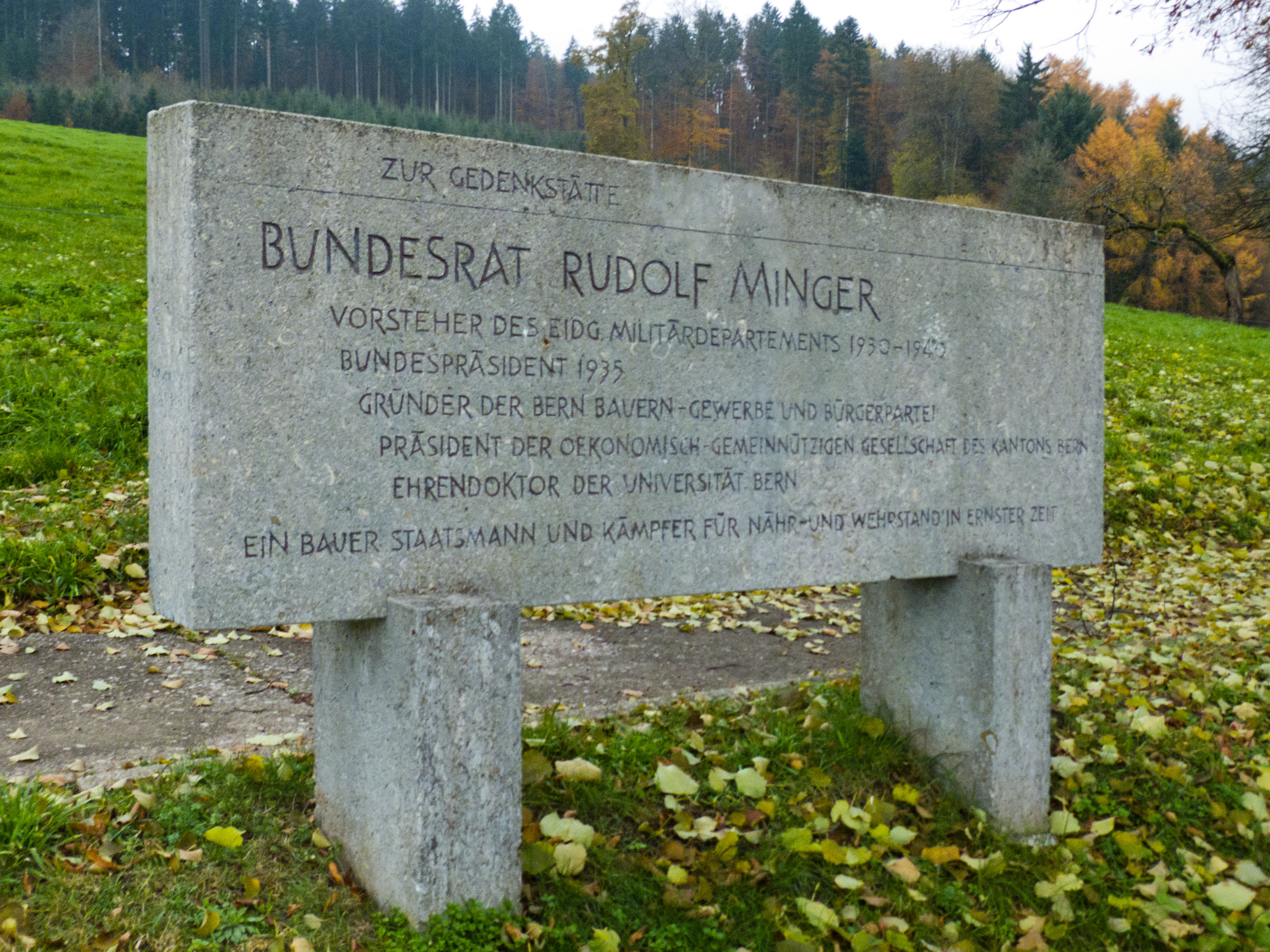
Rudolf Minger memorial in Schüpfen

The entire village of Schwanden and the hamlet of Winterswil are designated as part of the Inventory of Swiss Heritage Sites.

== Politics ==
In the 2011 federal election the most popular party was the SVP which received 31.5% of the vote. The next three most popular parties were the BDP Party (19.5%), the SPS (19.2%) and the Green Party (8.3%). In the federal election, a total of 1,384 votes were cast, and the voter turnout was 51.9%.

== Economy ==
As of 2011, Schüpfen had an unemployment rate of 1.13%. As of 2008, there were a total of 1,035 people employed in the municipality. Of these, there were 182 people employed in the primary economic sector and about 67 businesses involved in this sector. 197 people were employed in the secondary sector and there were 35 businesses in this sector. 656 people were employed in the tertiary sector, with 99 businesses in this sector.

In 2008 there were a total of 779 full-time equivalent jobs. The number of jobs in the primary sector was 116, of which 113 were in agriculture and 3 were in forestry or lumber production. The number of jobs in the secondary sector was 179 of which 65 or (36.3%) were in manufacturing, 3 or (1.7%) were in mining and 101 (56.4%) were in construction. The number of jobs in the tertiary sector was 484. In the tertiary sector; 121 or 25.0% were in wholesale or retail sales or the repair of motor vehicles, 101 or 20.9% were in the movement and storage of goods, 27 or 5.6% were in a hotel or restaurant, 8 or 1.7% were in the information industry, 10 or 2.1% were the insurance or financial industry, 24 or 5.0% were technical professionals or scientists, 35 or 7.2% were in education and 121 or 25.0% were in health care.

In 2000, there were 390 workers who commuted into the municipality and 1,305 workers who commuted away. The municipality is a net exporter of workers, with about 3.3 workers leaving the municipality for every one entering. Of the working population, 25.3% used public transportation to get to work, and 51.4% used a private car.

== Religion ==
From the 2000 census, 343 or 10.3% were Roman Catholic, while 2,517 or 75.9% belonged to the Swiss Reformed Church. Of the rest of the population, there were 16 members of an Orthodox church (or about 0.48% of the population), there were 6 individuals (or about 0.18% of the population) who belonged to the Christian Catholic Church, and there were 166 individuals (or about 5.00% of the population) who belonged to another Christian church. There were 4 individuals (or about 0.12% of the population) who were Jewish, and 28 (or about 0.84% of the population) who were Islamic. There were 6 individuals who were Buddhist and 5 individuals who belonged to another church. 223 (or about 6.72% of the population) belonged to no church, are agnostic or atheist, and 82 individuals (or about 2.47% of the population) did not answer the question.

== Education ==
In Schüpfen about 1,409 or (42.5%) of the population have completed non-mandatory upper secondary education, and 484 or (14.6%) have completed additional higher education (either university or a Fachhochschule). Of the 484 who completed tertiary schooling, 71.1% were Swiss men, 24.4% were Swiss women, 2.5% were non-Swiss men and 2.1% were non-Swiss women.

The Canton of Bern school system provides one year of non-obligatory Kindergarten, followed by six years of Primary school. This is followed by three years of obligatory lower Secondary school where the students are separated according to ability and aptitude. Following the lower Secondary students may attend additional schooling or they may enter an apprenticeship.

During the 2009-10 school year, there were a total of 380 students attending classes in Schüpfen. There were 3 kindergarten classes with a total of 46 students in the municipality. Of the kindergarten students, 4.3% were permanent or temporary residents of Switzerland (not citizens) and 8.7% have a different mother language than the classroom language. The municipality had 11 primary classes and 211 students. Of the primary students, 3.3% were permanent or temporary residents of Switzerland (not citizens) and 4.3% have a different mother language than the classroom language. During the same year, there were 7 lower secondary classes with a total of 123 students. There were 3.3% who were permanent or temporary residents of Switzerland (not citizens) and 4.1% have a different mother language than the classroom language. As of 2000, there were 27 students in Schüpfen who came from another municipality, while 138 residents attended schools outside the municipality.

== Notable residents ==
- Rudolf Minger (1881–1955) Member of the Swiss Federal Council (1929-1940) and President of the Swiss Confederation in 1935.
- Billy Cobham (born May 16, 1944) Panamanian–American jazz drummer
