= Kirchlindach =

- Municipality
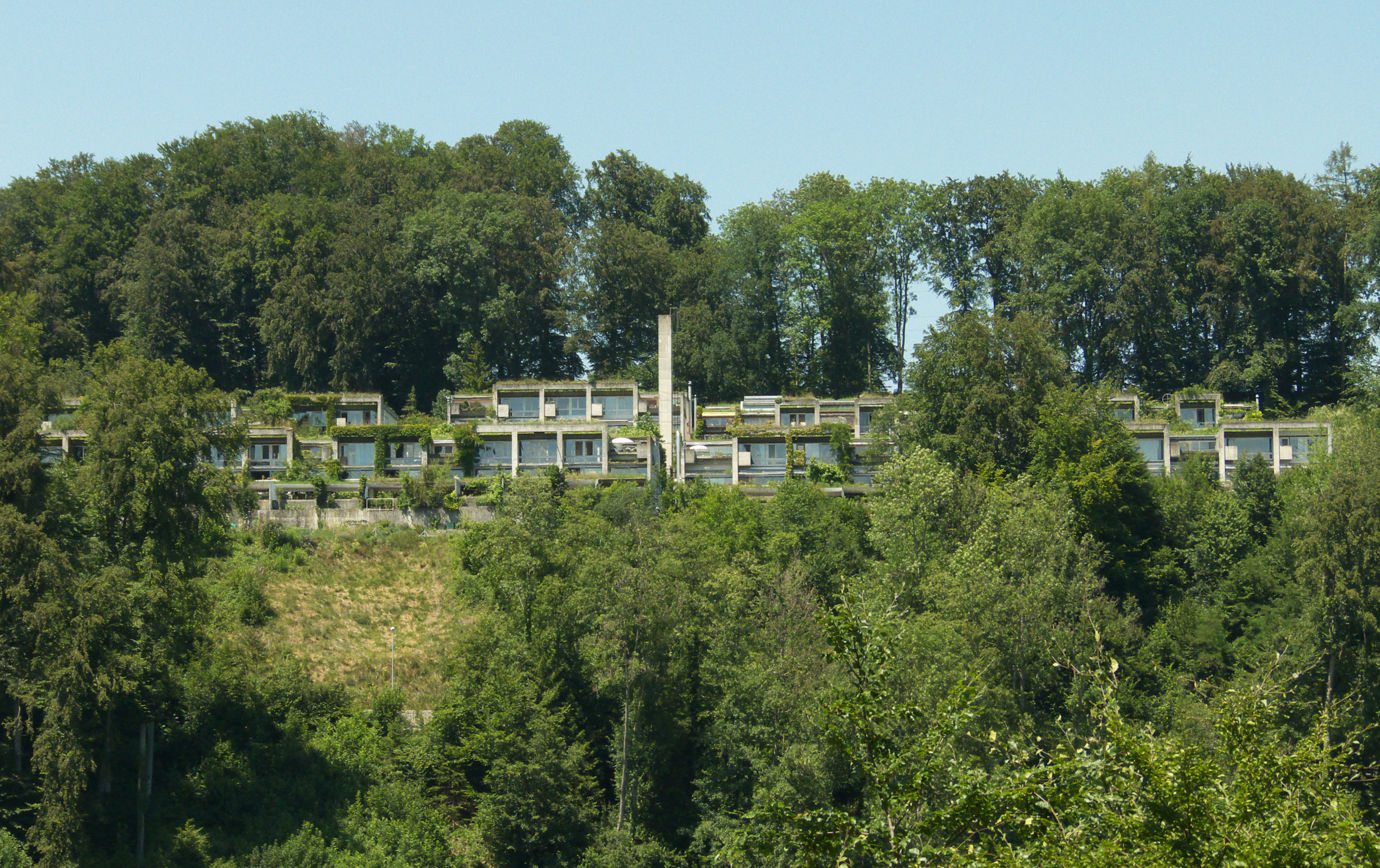
- The Halen development (Siedlung Halen) in summer

- Flag Coat of arms
- Location of Kirchlindach
- Location within Switzerland Location within Canton of Bern
- Coordinates: 46°59′N 7°24′E
- Country: Switzerland
- Canton: Bern
- District: Bern-Mittelland

Government
  - Executive: Gemeinderat with 5 members
  - Mayor: Gemeindepräsident; Adrian Müller FDP/PLR (as of 2026)

Area
  - Total: 11.9 km^{2} (4.6 sq mi)
- Elevation: 595 m (1,952 ft)

Population (December 2020)
  - Total: 3,200
  - Density: 270/km^{2} (700/sq mi)
- Time zone: UTC+01:00 (CET)
  - Summer (DST): UTC+02:00 (CEST)
- Postal code: 3038
- SFOS number: 354
- ISO 3166 code: CH-BE
- Surrounded by: Bern, Bremgarten bei Bern, Diemerswil, Meikirch, Münchenbuchsee, Schüpfen, Wohlen bei Bern, Zollikofen
- Website: kirchlindach.ch

Kirchlindach is a municipality in the Bern-Mittelland administrative district in the canton of Bern in Switzerland.

== History ==
The name Lindenacho (for Kirchlindach) first appeared in writing on 2 October 1185, when Pope Lucius III affirmed legal possession of the area to Erlach in a papal bull.

A number of Hallstatt grave mounds, a La Tène period grave with jewelry and a stone bowl all indicate prehistoric settlements in the area. During the Roman era there was a Roman estate near Muri-Alchenmatte between Oberlindach and Buchsacker. During the Middle Ages the most important land owner was the Lords of Bremgarten. In 1185, they granted some of their land in Kirchlindach to St. Johannsen Abbey in Erlach. By 1300, the Lords of Bremgarten lost the remainder of their lands and wealthy families in Bern became the main land owners. The low court was usually administered by Bern through the court of Herrenschwanden while the high court for Kirchlindach was held in the district capital of Zollikofen.

Kirchlindach was home to several large country estates that were built by Bernese patricians. In the 12th or 13th century the stone late-Romanesque country estate of Heimenhaus was built in the village. In the 18th century Werdt Matthey bought the old estate and remodeled and expanded it. Nüchtern estate was built at the beginning of the 18th century. In 1891 it became a health resort and in the late 20th century, a social therapy center. Sacker estate was built in 1727 and is now a farm house.

The village church of St. George was built around 1200 and was first mentioned in 1275. It was built above a couple of earlier, high medieval churches including an 8th-century wooden building and a stone building from the 9th or 10th century. The building was renovated and rebuilt several times during its history. The tower was rebuilt in the 13th century, followed by the chancel in the 14th century. In 1766 the main hall of the church was renovated. The 14th- and 15th-century wall paintings were restored in 1907 and the entire building was renovated in 1978–79.

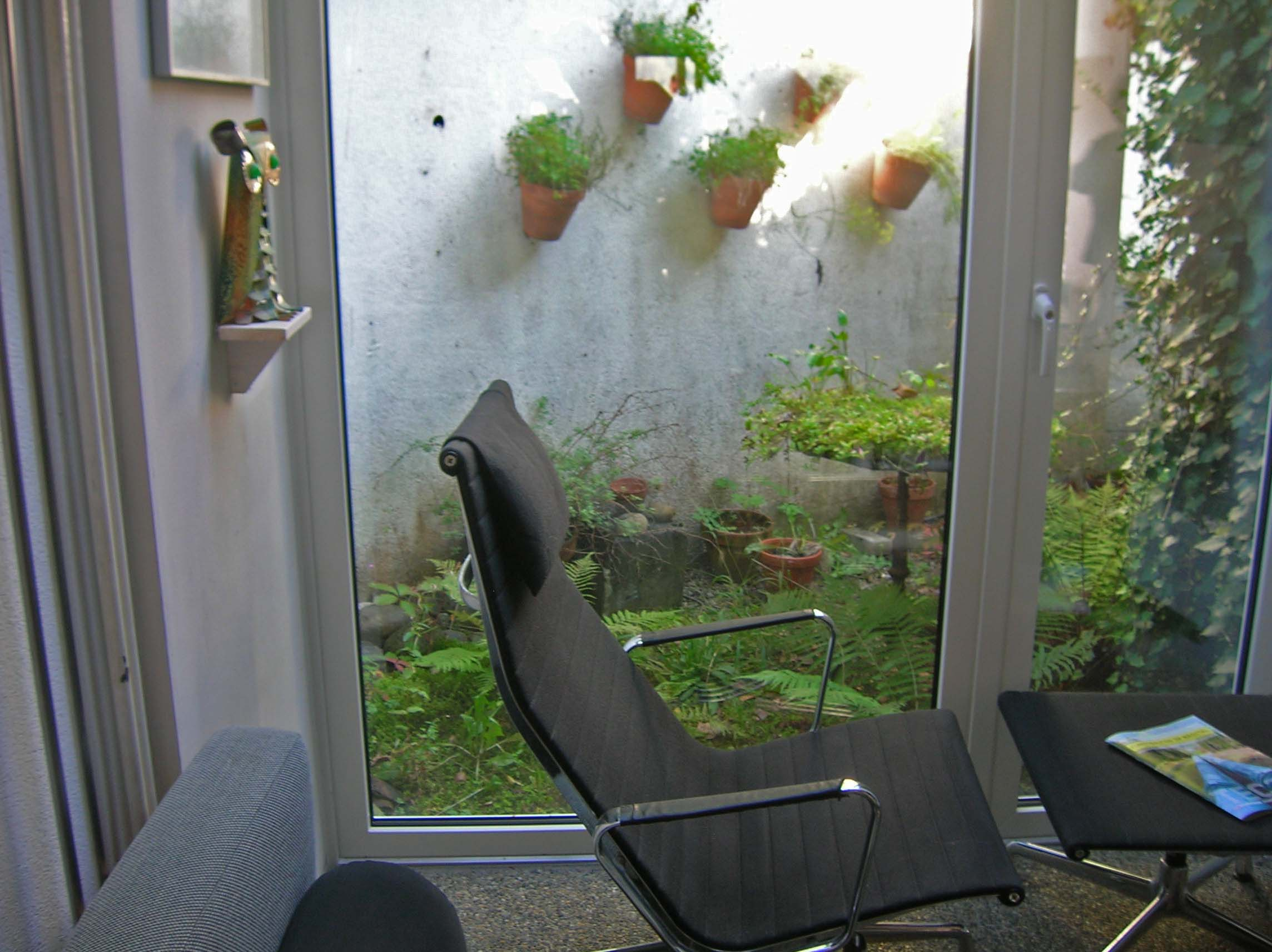
Office and small garden in the Halen development

During the Middle Ages, Kirchlindach, Niederlindach, Oberlindach, Jetzikofen, Heimenhaus and Herrenschwanden were all farming villages. Beginning in the 18th century, the local farms switched from growing grain for local consumption to producing hay, milk, vegetables and fruit for the weekly market in Bern. The village was located on the Bern-Aarberg highway after 1467, when the Neubrücke (New Bridge) was built over the Aare river. Starting in the 1950s, the population grew in the villages surrounding Bern. However, in Kirchlindach, the old village centers remained mostly intact and new construction happened in detached settlements. In Herrenschwanden several pioneering large housing developments were built between 1957 and the 1970s. These "Holistic Building" designs featured integrated offices, studios and gardens in a compact mixed residential and commercial development. The first project was Halen (built 1957–61) above the Halen bridge. This was followed in the 1970s by the Hostalen, Thalmatt (I-II) and Möslimatt projects. The area around Halen is both a Swiss heritage site of national significance and on the Inventory of Swiss Heritage Sites. Between 1950 and 1980, the population doubled, as commuters moved into the municipality. Despite jobs in agriculture and light industry, the majority of workers in Kirchlindach now commute to Bern for work.

== Geography ==
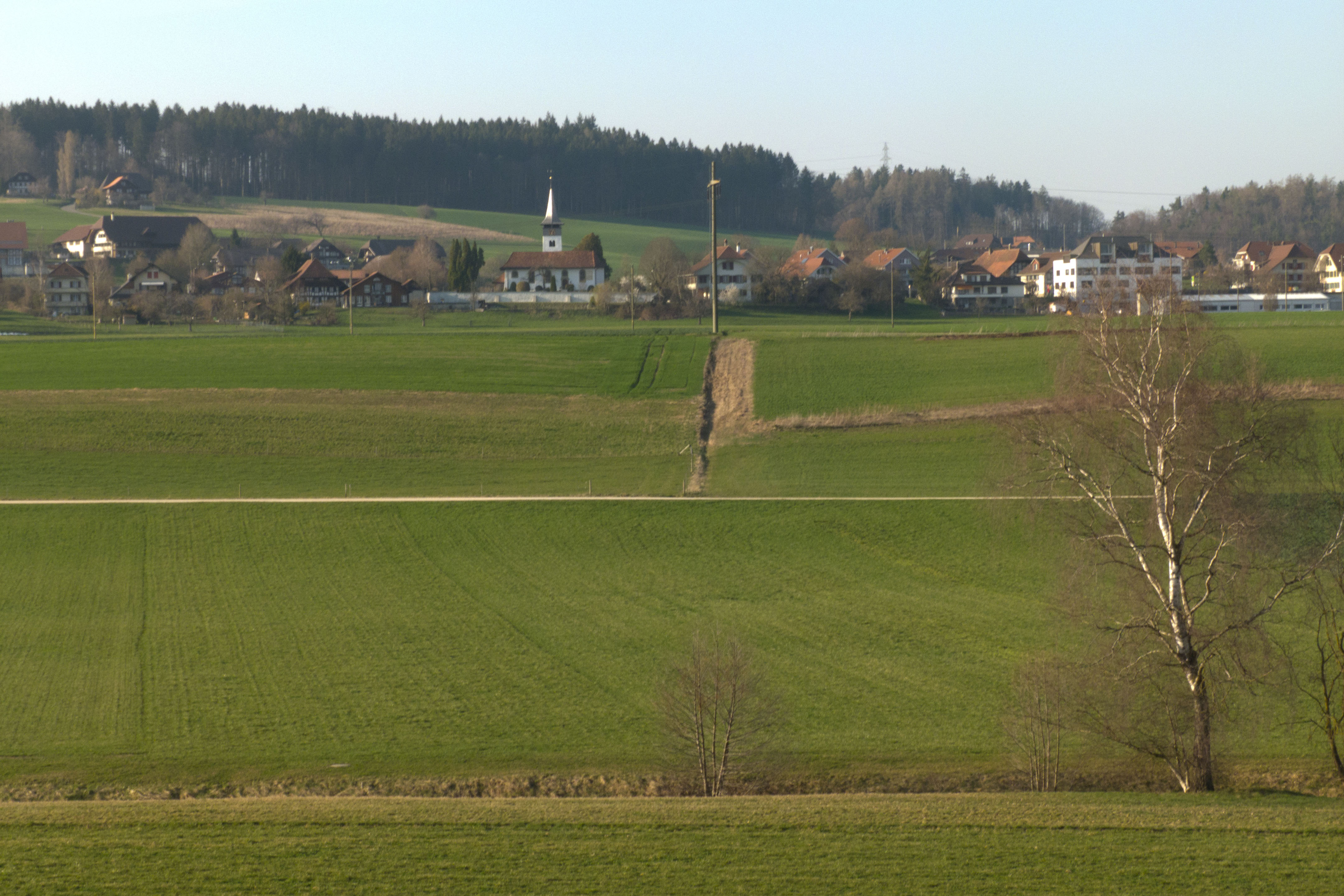
Kirchlindach village

Kirchlindach has an area of 11.96 km^{2} (4.62 sq mi). Of this area, 7.97 km^{2} (3.08 mi^{2}) or 66.7% is used for agricultural purposes, while 2.83 km^{2} (1.09 mi^{2}) or 23.7% is forested. Of the rest of the land, 1.01 km^{2} (0.39 mi^{2}) or 8.5% is settled (buildings or roads), 0.09 km^{2} (22 acres) or 0.8% is either rivers or lakes and 0.02 km^{2} (4.9 acres) or 0.2% is unproductive land.

Of the built up area, housing and buildings made up 5.8% and transportation infrastructure made up 2.2%. Out of the forested land, all of the forested land area is covered with heavy forests. Of the agricultural land, 52.9% is used for growing crops and 12.5% is pastures, while 1.3% is used for orchards or vine crops. Of the water in the municipality, 0.2% is in lakes and 0.6% is in rivers and streams.

The municipality is located in the agglomeration of Bern, on a terrace on the slopes of the Schüpberg above the right bank of the Aare river. It consists of the villages of Kirchlindach, Oberlindach and Herrenschwanden as well as hamlets and individual farm houses.

On 31 December 2009 Amtsbezirk Bern, the municipality's former district, was dissolved. On the following day, 1 January 2010, it joined the newly created Verwaltungskreis Bern-Mittelland.

== Coat of arms ==
The blazon of the municipal coat of arms is Argent a Bar Gules between three Linden Leaves Vert.

== Demographics ==
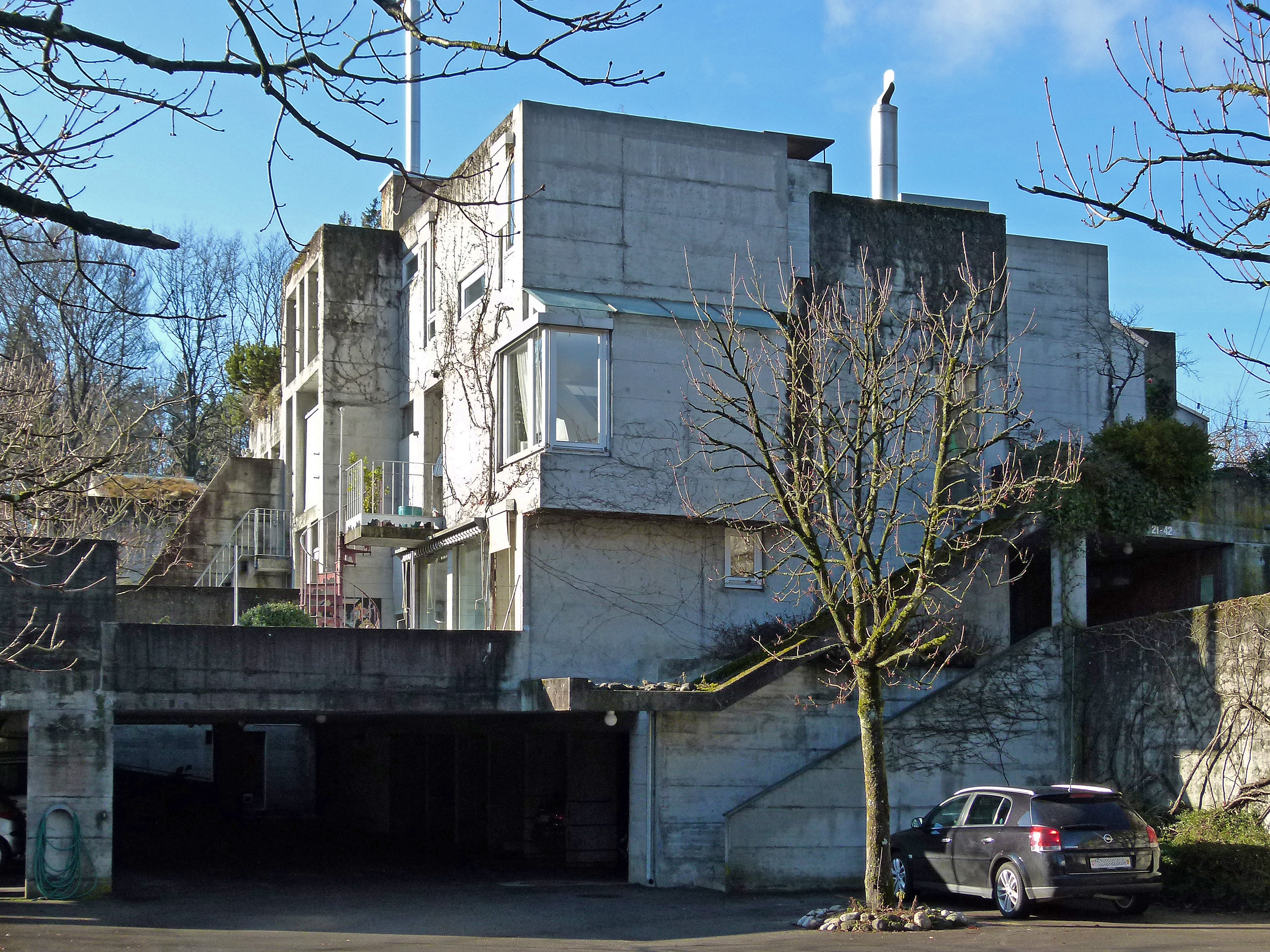
Thalmatt I development in Herrenschwanden from 1967 to 1974

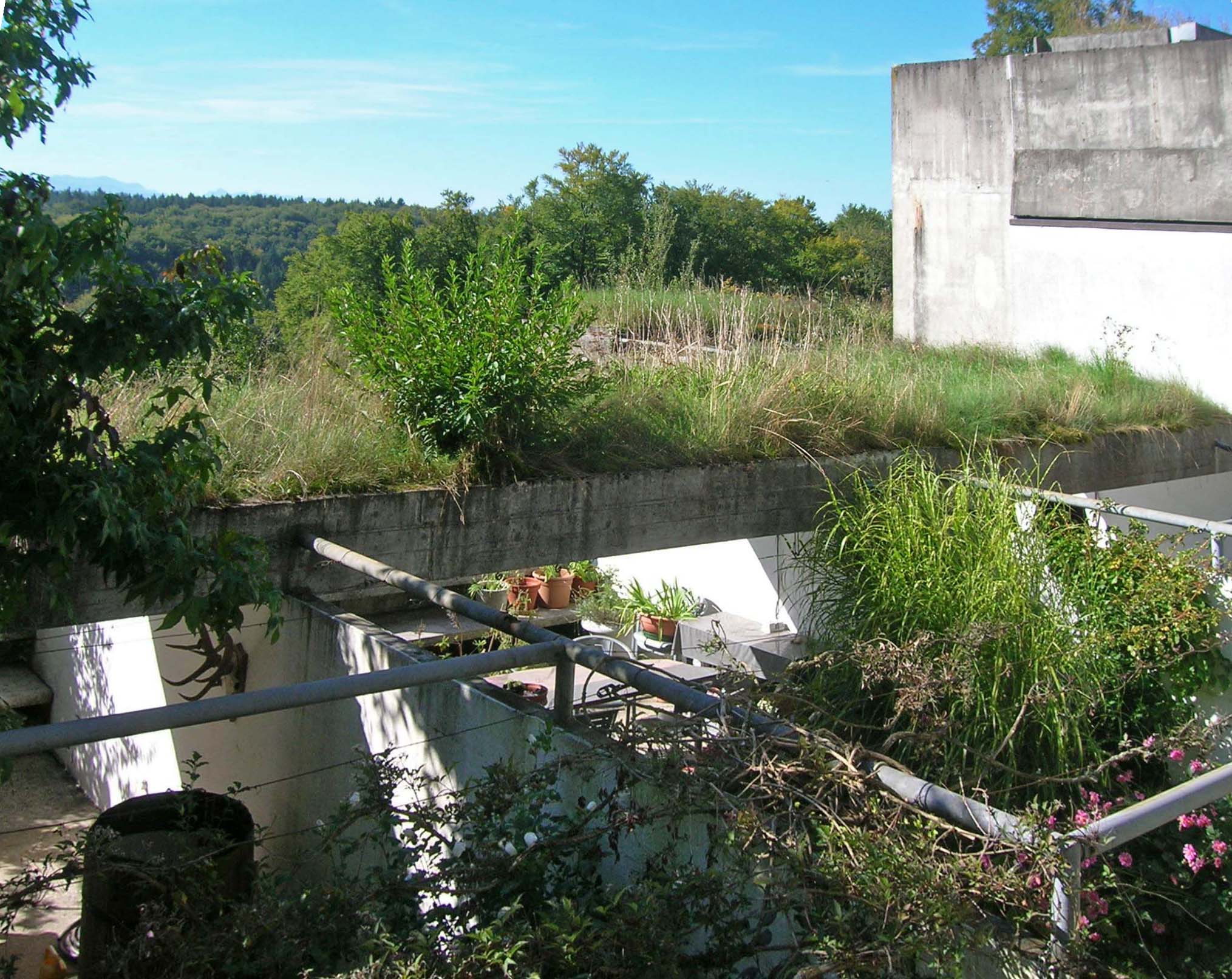
Garden and terrace in the Halen development

Kirchlindach has a population (as of December 2020) of 3,200. As of 2010, 5.9% of the population are resident foreign nationals. Over the last 10 years (2000–2010) the population has changed at a rate of 5.2%. Migration accounted for 4.8%, while births and deaths accounted for 1.4%.

Most of the population (as of 2000) speaks German (2,538 or 92.8%) as their first language, French is the second most common (61 or 2.2%) and Italian is the third (18 or 0.7%). There are 5 people who speak Romansh.

As of 2008, the population was 47.6% male and 52.4% female. The population was made up of 1,282 Swiss men (45.0% of the population) and 75 (2.6%) non-Swiss men. There were 1,398 Swiss women (49.1%) and 94 (3.3%) non-Swiss women. Of the population in the municipality, 576 or about 21.1% were born in Kirchlindach and lived there in 2000. There were 1,302 or 47.6% who were born in the same canton, while 518 or 18.9% were born somewhere else in Switzerland, and 265 or 9.7% were born outside of Switzerland.

As of 2010, children and teenagers (0–19 years old) make up 18.3% of the population, while adults (20–64 years old) make up 60.7% and seniors (over 64 years old) make up 21%.

As of 2000, there were 1,107 people who were single and never married in the municipality. There were 1,352 married individuals, 136 widows or widowers and 141 individuals who are divorced.

As of 2000, there were 313 households that consist of only one person and 75 households with five or more people. In 2000, a total of 1,083 apartments (92.2% of the total) were permanently occupied, while 76 apartments (6.5%) were seasonally occupied and 15 apartments (1.3%) were empty. As of 2010, the construction rate of new housing units was 2.8 new units per 1000 residents.

The historical population is given in the following chart:

== Heritage sites of national significance ==
The Halenbrücke (Halen bridge, shared with Bern), the Neubrügg (New bridge, shared with Bern) and the Siedlung Halen (Halen settlement) are listed as Swiss heritage site of national significance. The entire Siedlung Halen is part of the Inventory of Swiss Heritage Sites.

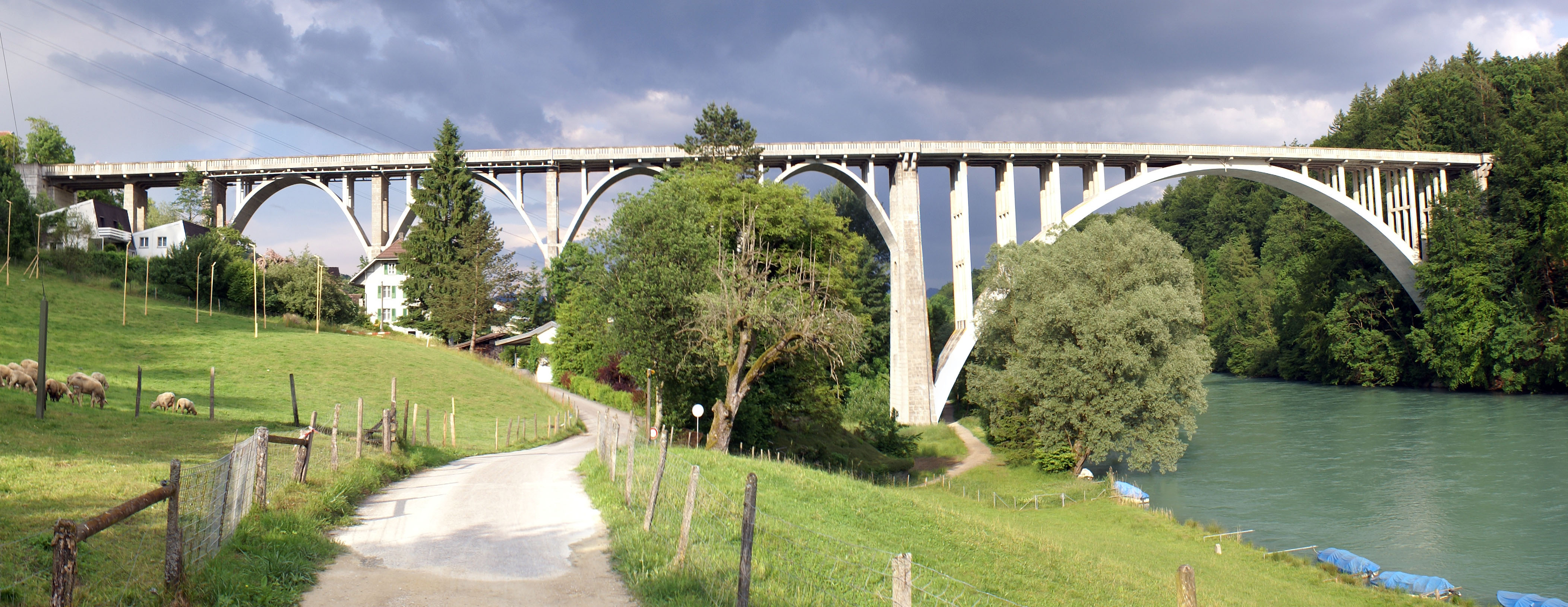
Halenbrücke (Bridge)

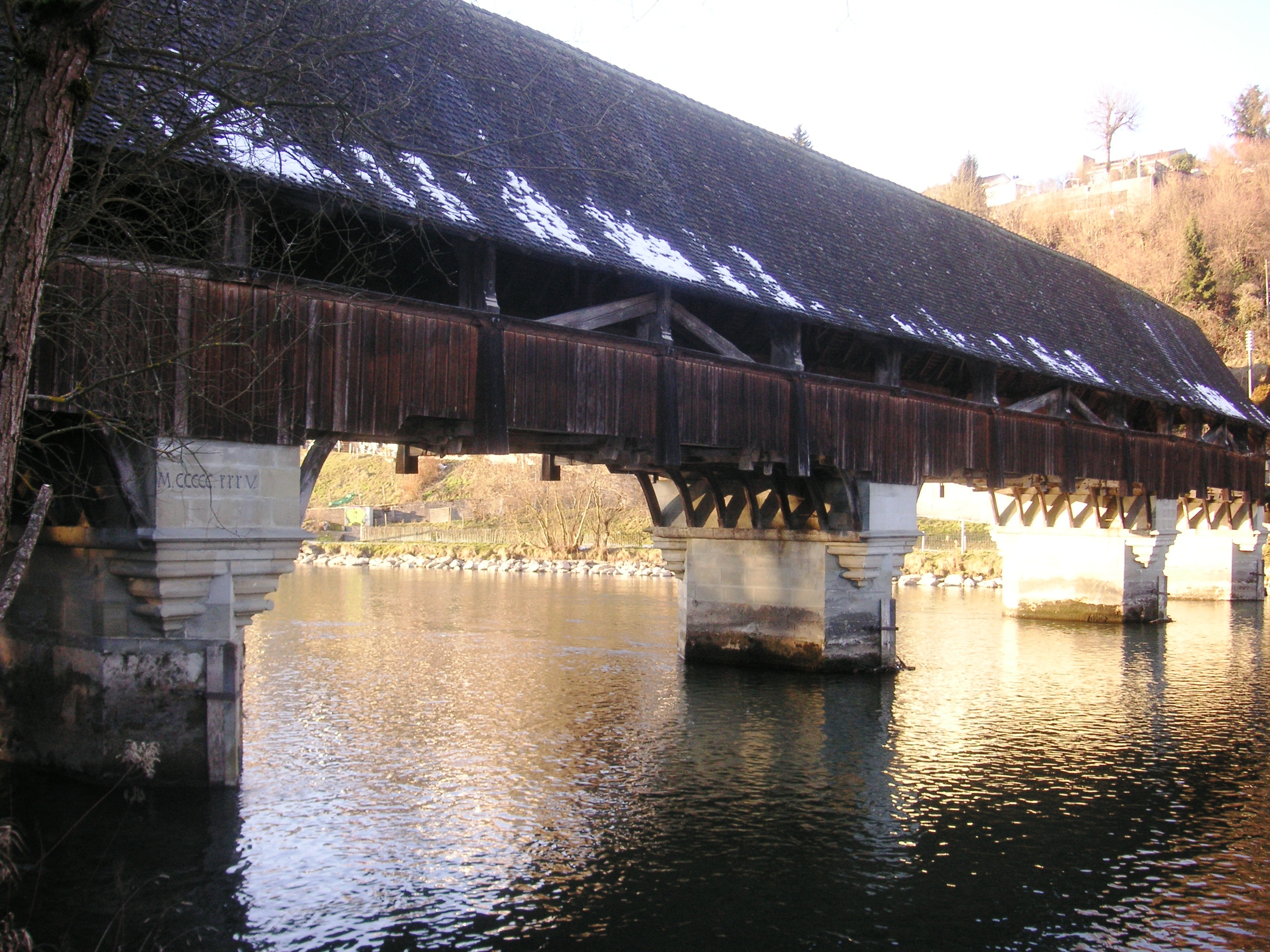
Neubrügg (Bridge)

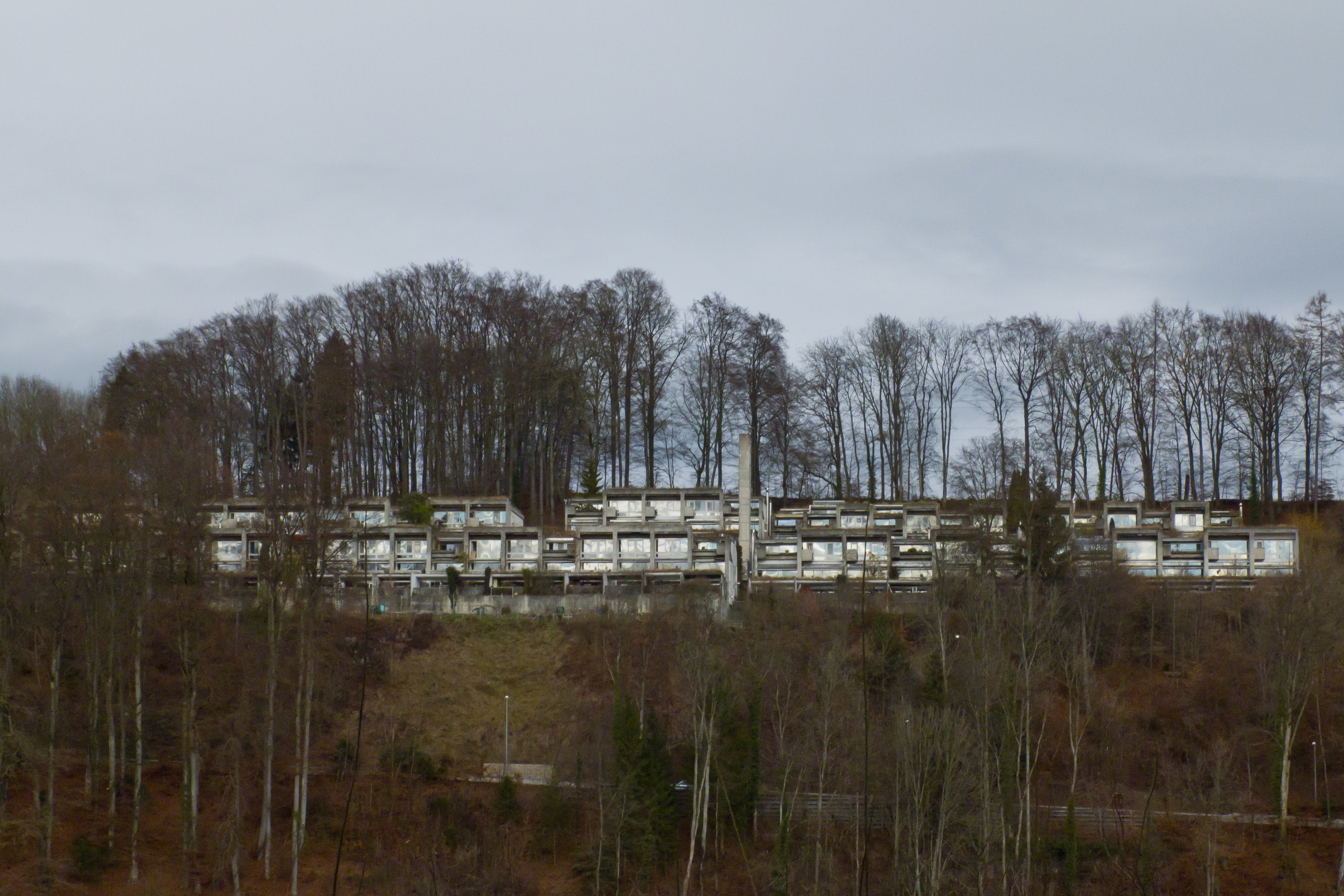
Siedlung Halen in December

== Politics ==
In the 2011 federal election the most popular party was the SVP which received 25.5% of the vote. The next three most popular parties were the SPS (18.8%), the BDP Party (14.2%) and the FDP (13.1%). In the federal election, a total of 1,485 votes were cast, and the voter turnout was 66.0%.

== Economy ==
As of 2011, Kirchlindach had an unemployment rate of 1.67%. As of 2008, there were a total of 676 people employed in the municipality. Of these, there were 122 people employed in the primary economic sector and about 40 businesses involved in this sector. 76 people were employed in the secondary sector and there were 14 businesses in this sector. 478 people were employed in the tertiary sector, with 77 businesses in this sector.

In 2008 there were a total of 499 full-time equivalent jobs. The number of jobs in the primary sector was 90, all of which were in agriculture. The number of jobs in the secondary sector was 71 of which 49 or (69.0%) were in manufacturing and 22 (31.0%) were in construction. The number of jobs in the tertiary sector was 338. In the tertiary sector; 74 or 21.9% were in wholesale or retail sales or the repair of motor vehicles, 17 or 5.0% were in the movement and storage of goods, 40 or 11.8% were in a hotel or restaurant, 7 or 2.1% were in the information industry, 26 or 7.7% were technical professionals or scientists, 36 or 10.7% were in education and 104 or 30.8% were in health care.

In 2000, there were 330 workers who commuted into the municipality and 1,139 workers who commuted away. The municipality is a net exporter of workers, with about 3.5 workers leaving the municipality for every one entering. Of the working population, 33.9% used public transportation to get to work, and 42.3% used a private car.

== Religion ==
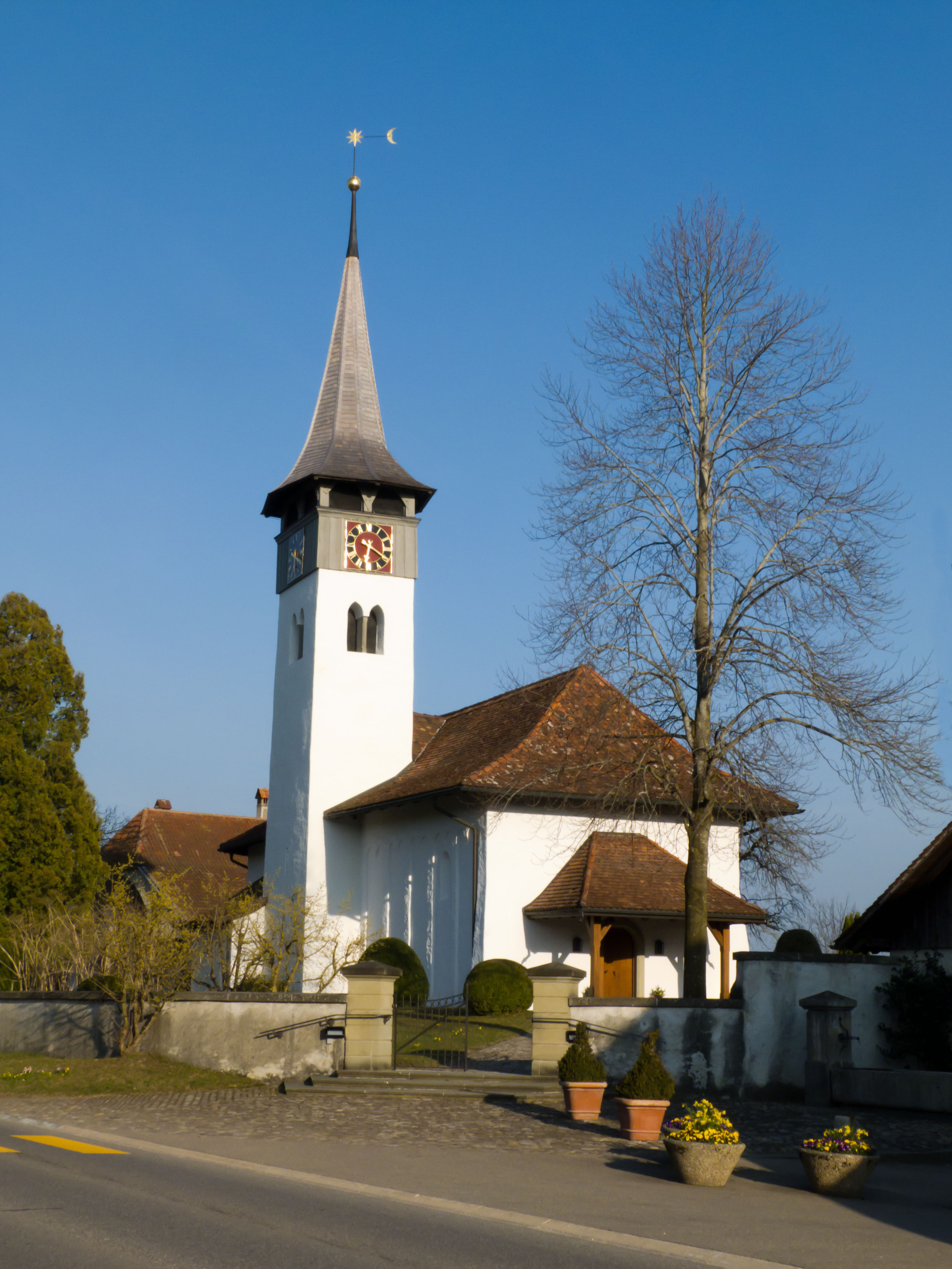
Kirchlindach village church

From the 2000 census, 414 or 15.1% were Roman Catholic, while 1,793 or 65.5% belonged to the Swiss Reformed Church. Of the rest of the population, there were 8 members of an Orthodox church (or about 0.29% of the population), there were 2 individuals (or about 0.07% of the population) who belonged to the Christian Catholic Church, and there were 172 individuals (or about 6.29% of the population) who belonged to another Christian church. There were 4 individuals (or about 0.15% of the population) who were Jewish, and 39 (or about 1.43% of the population) who were Islamic. There were 5 individuals who were Buddhist, 2 individuals who were Hindu and 3 individuals who belonged to another church. 323 (or about 11.81% of the population) belonged to no church, are agnostic or atheist, and 52 individuals (or about 1.90% of the population) did not answer the question.

== Education ==
In Kirchlindach about 1,123 or (41.0%) of the population have completed non-mandatory upper secondary education, and 632 or (23.1%) have completed additional higher education (either university or a Fachhochschule). Of the 632 who completed tertiary schooling, 68.4% were Swiss men, 25.3% were Swiss women, 4.1% were non-Swiss men and 2.2% were non-Swiss women.

The Canton of Bern school system provides one year of non-obligatory Kindergarten, followed by six years of Primary school. This is followed by three years of obligatory lower Secondary school where the students are separated according to ability and aptitude. Following the lower Secondary students may attend additional schooling or they may enter an apprenticeship.

During the 2009–10 school year, there were a total of 180 students attending classes in Kirchlindach. There were 2 kindergarten classes with a total of 47 students in the municipality. Of the kindergarten students, 2.1% were permanent or temporary residents of Switzerland (not citizens) and 6.4% have a different mother language than the classroom language. The municipality had 7 primary classes and 133 students. Of the primary students, 2.3% were permanent or temporary residents of Switzerland (not citizens) and 2.3% have a different mother language than the classroom language.

As of 2000, there were 20 students in Kirchlindach who came from another municipality, while 208 residents attended schools outside the municipality.

== Crime ==
In 2014 the crime rate, of the over 200 crimes listed in the Swiss Criminal Code (running from murder, robbery and assault to accepting bribes and election fraud), in Kirchlindach was 15.2 per thousand residents. This rate is much lower than average, only 22.1% of the rate in the district, 25.9% of the cantonal rate and 23.5% of the average rate in the entire country. During the same period, the rate of drug crimes was 1.4 per thousand residents. This rate is lower than average, only 7.0% of the rate in the district, 10.4% of the rate in the canton and only 14.1% of the national rate. The rate of violations of immigration, visa and work permit laws was 1.4 per thousand residents. This rate is only 36.8% of the rate in the district, 42.4% of the rate in the canton and 28.6% of the rate for the entire country.
