= Diemerswil =

- Former municipality
- Flag Coat of arms
- Location of Diemerswil
- Location within Switzerland Location within Canton of Bern
- Coordinates: 47°1′N 7°26′E
- Country: Switzerland
- Canton: Bern
- District: Bern-Mittelland

Area
  - Total: 2.8 km^{2} (1.1 sq mi)
- Elevation: 600 m (2,000 ft)

Population (December 2020)
  - Total: 199
  - Density: 71/km^{2} (180/sq mi)
- Time zone: UTC+01:00 (CET)
  - Summer (DST): UTC+02:00 (CEST)
- Postal code: 3053
- SFOS number: 536
- ISO 3166 code: CH-BE
- Surrounded by: Kirchlindach, Münchenbuchsee, Schüpfen
- Website: SFSO statistics

Diemerswil is a former municipality in the Bern-Mittelland administrative district in the canton of Bern in Switzerland. On 1 January 2023 the former municipality of Diemerswil merged to form the municipality of Münchenbuchsee.

== History ==
Diemerswil is first mentioned in 1257 as Diemarswile.

The earliest trace of people in the area is a Hallstatt culture grave mound with a cart or wagon, in the Brandwald. During the Middle Ages it belonged to the Herrschaft, court and parish of the Münchenbuchsee Commandery. After the Commandery was secularized in 1528, the village became part of the Bernese bailiwick of Münchenbuchsee. In 1803 it became part of the district of Fraubrunnen.

During the 19th century, many of local farmers began to raise dairy cattle instead of or in addition to their traditional crops. The village school was built in 1827, but students still have to travel to Münchenbuchsee for secondary school. The so-called Schloss, an elegant country manor house, was demolished in 1969. The village has remained generally rural and agricultural. In 2000 almost half of all working residents worked in agriculture. At the same time about half the residents commuted for work in other communities, especially Bern.

== Geography ==
Diemerswil has an area of 2.86 km^{2} (1.10 sq mi). Of this area, 2.08 km^{2} (0.80 mi^{2}) or 72.7% is used for agricultural purposes, while 0.56 km^{2} (0.22 mi^{2}) or 19.6% is forested. Of the rest of the land, 0.17 km^{2} (0.066 mi^{2}) or 5.9% is settled (buildings or roads).

Of the built up area, housing and buildings made up 2.4% and transportation infrastructure made up 3.1%. Out of the forested land, all of the forested land area is covered with heavy forests. Of the agricultural land, 58.4% is used for growing crops and 11.9% is pastures, while 2.4% is used for orchards or vine crops.

Diemerswil is located on the south east side of the Moos Lake valley and includes the hamlets of Dörfli, Kohlholz, Mettlen, Moos, Riedmatt and Wydacker. It belongs to the parish and greater community (Gemeindeverband) of Münchenbuchsee.

On 31 December 2009 Amtsbezirk Fraubrunnen, the municipality's former district, was dissolved. On the following day, 1 January 2010, it joined the newly created Verwaltungskreis Bern-Mittelland.

== Coat of arms ==
The blazon of the municipal coat of arms is Per fess Gules a Cross Argent and of the second a Rose of the first barbed, seeded, slipped and leaved proper.

== Demographics ==
Diemerswil has a population (as of December 2020) of 199. As of 2010, 1.5% of the population are resident foreign nationals. Over the last 10 years (2000–2010) the population has changed at a rate of 21.1%. Migration accounted for 9.4%, while births and deaths accounted for 9.9%.

Most of the population (as of 2000) speaks German (163 or 97.6%) as their first language, French is the second most common (3 or 1.8%) and Portuguese is the third (1 or 0.6%).

As of 2008, the population was 51.2% male and 48.8% female. The population was made up of 103 Swiss men (50.2% of the population) and 2 (1.0%) non-Swiss men. There were 99 Swiss women (48.3%) and 1 (0.5%) non-Swiss women. Of the population in the municipality, 60 or about 35.9% were born in Diemerswil and lived there in 2000. There were 76 or 45.5% who were born in the same canton, while 20 or 12.0% were born somewhere else in Switzerland, and 8 or 4.8% were born outside of Switzerland.

As of 2010, children and teenagers (0–19 years old) make up 28.8% of the population, while adults (20–64 years old) make up 57.1% and seniors (over 64 years old) make up 14.1%.

As of 2000, there were 76 people who were single and never married in the municipality. There were 81 married individuals, 7 widows or widowers and 3 individuals who are divorced.

As of 2000, there were 15 households that consist of only one person and 8 households with five or more people. In 2000, a total of 61 apartments (93.8% of the total) were permanently occupied, while 3 apartments (4.6%) were seasonally occupied and one apartment was empty.

The historical population is given in the following chart:

== Politics ==
In the 2011 federal election the most popular party was the Swiss People's Party (SVP) which received 38.1% of the vote. The next three most popular parties were the Conservative Democratic Party (BDP) (13.2%), the Social Democratic Party (SP) (11%) and the Green Party (11%). In the federal election, a total of 106 votes were cast, and the voter turnout was 73.6%.

== Economy ==
As of 2011, Diemerswil had an unemployment rate of 0.67%. As of 2008, there were a total of 62 people employed in the municipality. Of these, there were 43 people employed in the primary economic sector and about 13 businesses involved in this sector. 5 people were employed in the secondary sector and there were 2 businesses in this sector. 14 people were employed in the tertiary sector, with 4 businesses in this sector. There were 97 residents of the municipality who were employed in some capacity, of which females made up 40.2% of the workforce.

In 2008 there were a total of 39 full-time equivalent jobs. The number of jobs in the primary sector was 27, all of which were in agriculture. The number of jobs in the secondary sector was 5, all of which were in construction. The number of jobs in the tertiary sector was 7. In the tertiary sector; 4 or 57.1% were in a hotel or restaurant, 1 was in the information industry and 2 were in education.

In 2000, there were 6 workers who commuted into the municipality and 59 workers who commuted away. The municipality is a net exporter of workers, with about 9.8 workers leaving the municipality for every one entering. Of the working population, 15.5% used public transportation to get to work, and 44.3% used a private car.

== Religion ==
From the 2000 census, 5 or 3.0% were Roman Catholic, while 132 or 79.0% belonged to the Swiss Reformed Church. Of the rest of the population, there was 1 individual who belongs to the Christian Catholic Church, and there were 23 individuals (or about 13.77% of the population) who belonged to another Christian church. 12 (or about 7.19% of the population) belonged to no church, are agnostic or atheist, and 5 individuals (or about 2.99% of the population) did not answer the question.

== Education ==
In Diemerswil about 81 or (48.5%) of the population have completed non-mandatory upper secondary education, and 32 or (19.2%) have completed additional higher education (either university or a Fachhochschule). Of the 32 who completed tertiary schooling, 62.5% were Swiss men, 37.5% were Swiss women.

The Canton of Bern school system provides one year of non-obligatory Kindergarten, followed by six years of Primary school. This is followed by three years of obligatory lower Secondary school where the students are separated according to ability and aptitude. Following the lower Secondary students may attend additional schooling or they may enter an apprenticeship.

During the 2010–11 school year, there were a total of 20 students attending classes in Diemerswil. There were no kindergarten classes in the municipality. The municipality had one primary class and 20 students.

As of 2000, there were 5 students in Diemerswil who came from another municipality, while 15 residents attended schools outside the municipality.
