= Otto Schneider-Orelli =

Swiss entomologist

Otto Schneider-Orelli (10 August 1880 in Münchenbuchsee – 31 October 1965 in Zürich) was a Swiss entomologist.

He studied natural sciences at the universities of Neuchâtel (1899) and Bern (1900–05). Following graduation, he worked as an assistant under Hermann Müller-Thurgau at the research institute for arboriculture, horticulture and viticulture in Wädenswil, where from 1913, he worked as an entomologist. From 1928 to 1950 he served as an associate professor of entomology at ETH Zurich and as director of the Institute of Entomology.

From 1917 onward, he was curator of collections at the entomology museum of ETH Zurich. He specialized in the fields of agricultural and forest entomology. He was the author of many treatises on phylloxera.

== Selected works ==
- Reblausversuche im Kanton Zürich, 1921 – Essay on phylloxera concerning the canton of Zürich.
- Die Reblaus und unser Weinbau, 1923 – Phylloxera and viticulture.
- Vergleichende Untersuchungen zur Reblausfrage (with Hans Leuzinger), 1924 – Comparative studies on phylloxera.
- Schädlingsbüchlein für Landwirtschaft, Garten, Haus und Hof, 1938 – "Pest booklet" for farming, gardening, home and yard.
- Entomologisches Praktikum; Einführung in die land- und forstwirtschaftliche Insektenkunde, 1947 – Entomological internship; introduction to agricultural and forest entomology.
