= Meikirch =

- Municipality
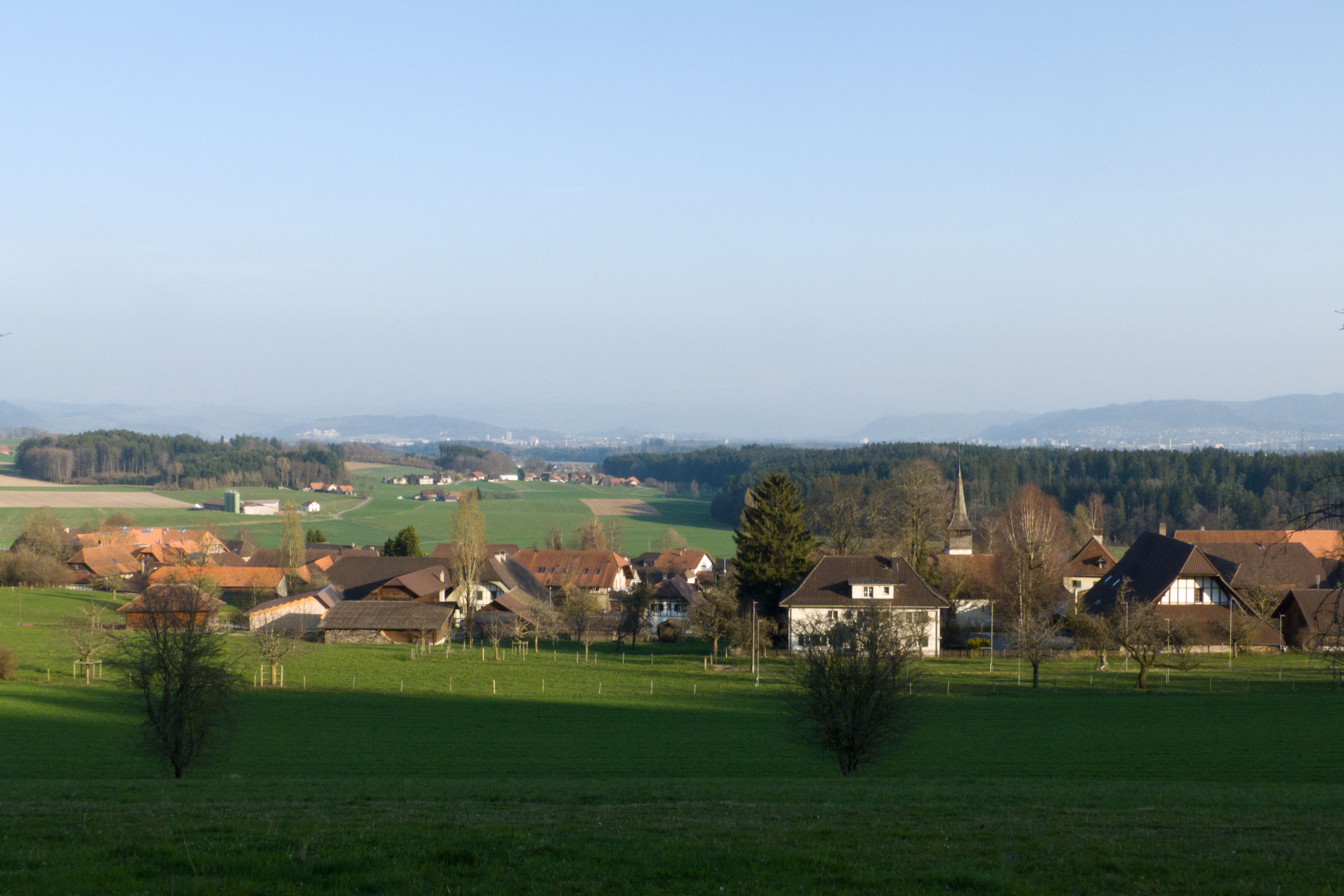
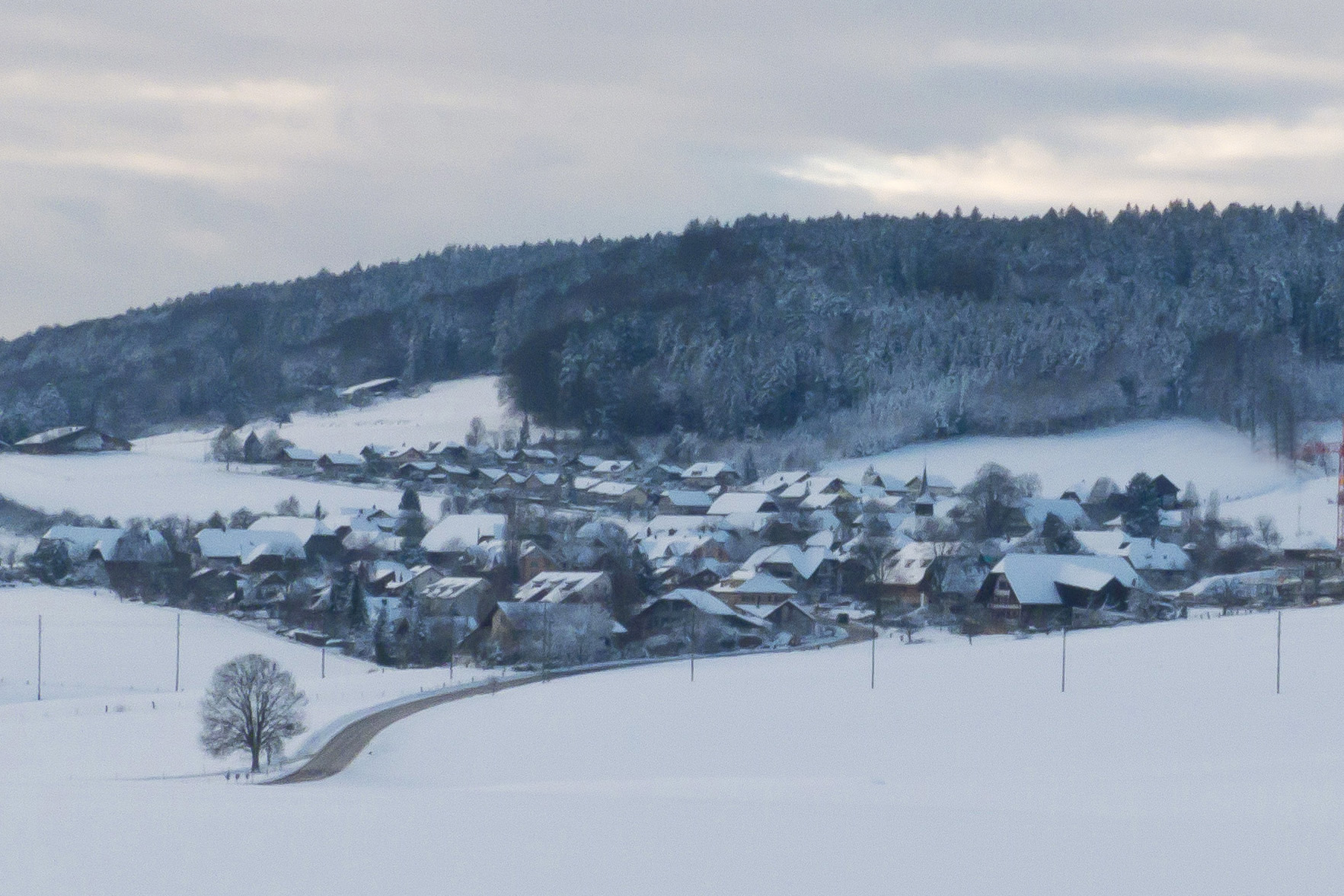
- Meikirch village Meikirch village

- Flag Coat of arms
- Location of Meikirch
- Location within Switzerland Location within Canton of Bern
- Coordinates: 47°0′N 7°22′E
- Country: Switzerland
- Canton: Bern
- District: Bern-Mittelland administrative district

Government
  - Executive: Gemeinderat with 7 members
  - Mayor: Gemeindepräsident(in); Hans Peter Salvisberg SVP/UDC (as of 2026)

Area
  - Total: 10.30 km^{2} (3.98 sq mi)
- Elevation: 654 m (2,146 ft)

Population (December 2020)
  - Total: 2,526
  - Density: 245.2/km^{2} (635.2/sq mi)
- Time zone: UTC+01:00 (CET)
  - Summer (DST): UTC+02:00 (CEST)
- Postal code: 3045
- SFOS number: 307
- ISO 3166 code: CH-BE
- Surrounded by: Kirchlindach, Schüpfen, Seedorf, Wohlen bei Bern
- Website: meikirch.ch

Meikirch is a municipality in the administrative district of Bern-Mittelland in the canton of Bern in Switzerland.

== History ==
Meikirch is first mentioned in 1208 as Mönchilcha.

Evidence of prehistoric settlements in Meikirch include rich Hallstatt sites in Grächwil and a Roman estate with wall paintings in Meikirch. The modern village was first settled and owned by the Monastery of Frienisberg. During the 13th and 14th centuries, the village was owned by the Bernburg family of Bolligen. During the 16th century, it was owned by the hereditary Schultheiss family of Aarberg, the Aebischers. In 1555 the Aebischer family sold the village to the city of Bern.

The village church was first mentioned in 1275, but was built in the 7th and 8th century on top of the ruins of a Roman villa. Portions of the early medieval and medieval churches have been preserved in spite of later alterations. The church tower is from the 12th century. In 1528, after the Protestant Reformation, the church came under the authority of Bern.

After the 1798 French invasion, it became part of the District of Zollikofen. Five years later, after the collapse of the Helvetic Republic, it was placed in the District of Aarberg. The municipality was on the old Bern-Frienisberg-Aarberg road and during the 18th and 19th centuries was part of the postal route between those towns. In 1851-52 a new road was built between Wohlen and Frieswil which bypassed Meikirch. The population began to decline after 1850 and the rate increased after World War I. During this time, the local farms changed from grain farming to cattle and dairy farming, which required fewer people and drove villagers away from Meikirch. The decline stopped with improved transport infrastructure, including the 1948 Postauto route to Bern. The population began to increase when, in 1960, a new road to Bern was completed. The old village houses were rebuilt and the new developments of Schützenrain, Weissenstein and Neu-Grächwil were built to provide housing for new residents. The Meikirch secondary school was founded in 1974.

== Geography ==
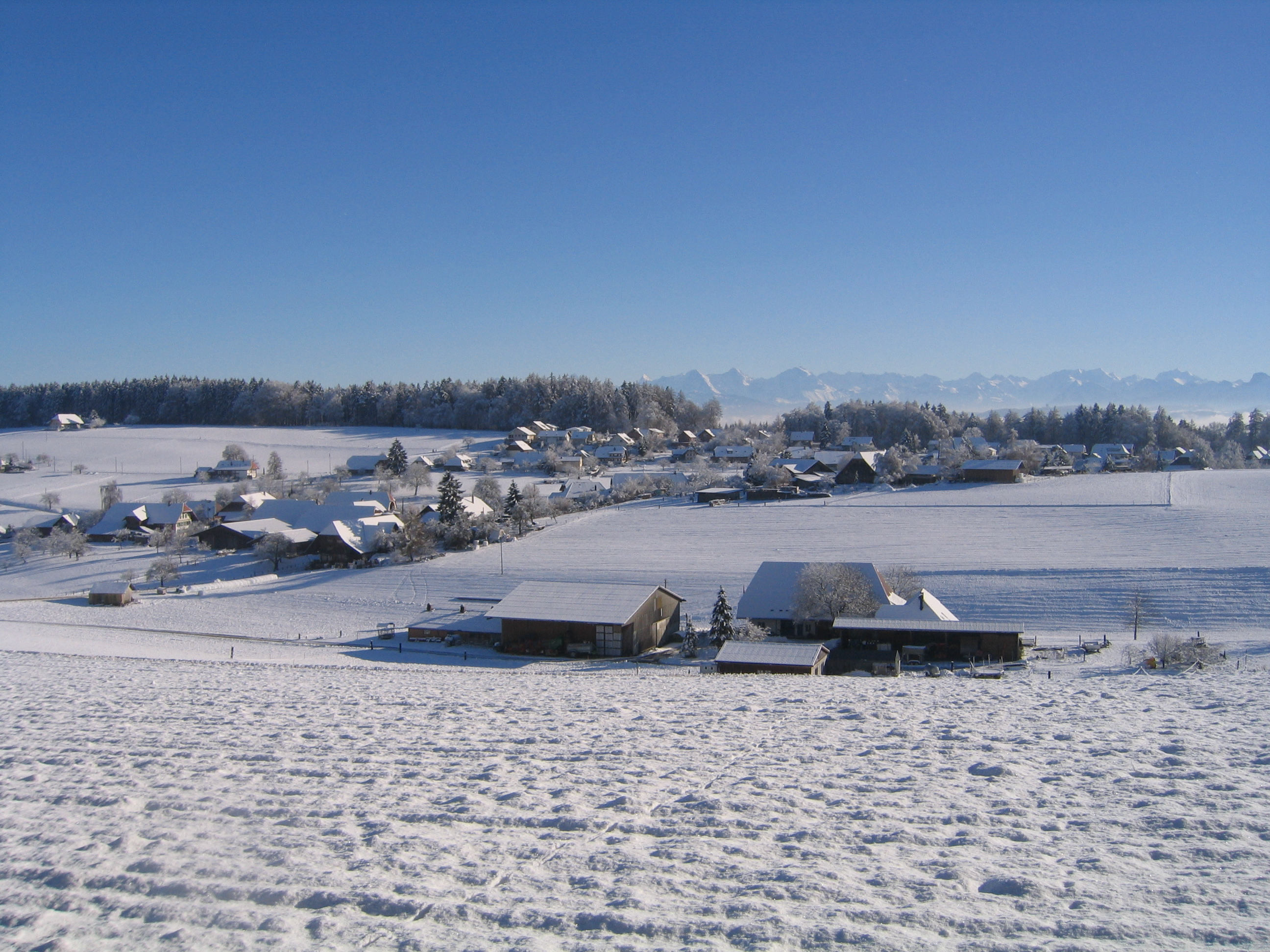
Wahlendorf village

Meikirch has an area, as of 2013-2014, of 10.23 km^{2} (3.95 sq mi). Of this area, 6.53 km^{2} (2.52 mi^{2}) or 63.8% is used for agricultural purposes, while 2.69 km^{2} (1.04 mi^{2}) or 26.3% is forested. Of the rest of the land, 1.02 km^{2} (0.39 mi^{2}) or 9.4% is settled (buildings or roads).

Of the built up area, housing and buildings made up 6.2% and transportation infrastructure made up 3.3%. Out of the forested land, nearly all of the forested land area is covered with heavy forests. Of the agricultural land, 47.5% is used for growing crops and 14.6% is pastures, while 1.8% is used for orchards or vine crops.

The municipality is a distant part of the agglomeration of Bern on the south-eastern edge of the Frienisberg plateau. It consists of the villages of Meikirch, Ortschwaben (first mentioned in 1185 as Nortsuaben) and Wahlendorf, the hamlets of Grächwil, Weissenstein and Äzikofen as well as scattered farms.

== Coat of arms ==
The blazon of the municipal coat of arms is Azure a Church Argent roofed Gules in chief sinister a Mullet of the second. The church (German: Kirche) makes this an example of canting arms.

== Demographics ==
Meikirch has a population (as of December 2020) of 2,526. As of 2010, 5.8% of the population are resident foreign nationals. Over the last 10 years (2000–2010) the population has changed at a rate of -5.1%. Migration accounted for -4.9%, while births and deaths accounted for 0.9%.

Most of the population (as of 2000) speaks German (2,368 or 95.4%) as their first language, French is the second most common (24 or 1.0%) and Italian is the third (19 or 0.8%).

As of 2008, the population was 48.0% male and 52.0% female. The population was made up of 1,047 Swiss men (44.6% of the population) and 79 (3.4%) non-Swiss men. There were 1,162 Swiss women (49.6%) and 57 (2.4%) non-Swiss women. Of the population in the municipality, 631 or about 25.4% were born in Meikirch and lived there in 2000. There were 1,153 or 46.5% who were born in the same canton, while 445 or 17.9% were born somewhere else in Switzerland, and 196 or 7.9% were born outside of Switzerland.

As of 2010, children and teenagers (0–19 years old) make up 18.6% of the population, while adults (20–64 years old) make up 61.2% and seniors (over 64 years old) make up 20.3%.

As of 2000, there were 999 people who were single and never married in the municipality. There were 1,297 married individuals, 103 widows or widowers and 83 individuals who are divorced.

As of 2000, there were 239 households that consist of only one person and 91 households with five or more people. In 2000, a total of 958 apartments (94.7% of the total) were permanently occupied, while 33 apartments (3.3%) were seasonally occupied and 21 apartments (2.1%) were empty.

As of 2010, the construction rate of new housing units was 1.3 new units per 1000 residents. The vacancy rate for the municipality, in 2011, was 4.48%.

The historical population is given in the following chart:

== Politics ==
In the 2011 federal election the most popular party was the SVP which received 24.6% of the vote. The next three most popular parties were the SPS (17.7%), the BDP Party (16.5%) and the Green Party (12.4%). In the federal election, a total of 1,173 votes were cast, and the voter turnout was 62.0%.

== Economy ==
As of 2011, Meikirch had an unemployment rate of 1.47%. As of 2008, there were a total of 492 people employed in the municipality. Of these, there were 87 people employed in the primary economic sector and about 29 businesses involved in this sector. 155 people were employed in the secondary sector and there were 26 businesses in this sector. 250 people were employed in the tertiary sector, with 53 businesses in this sector.

In 2008 the total number of full-time equivalent jobs was 376. The number of jobs in the primary sector was 58, all of which were in agriculture. The number of jobs in the secondary sector was 135 of which 20 or (14.8%) were in manufacturing and 116 (85.9%) were in construction. The number of jobs in the tertiary sector was 183. In the tertiary sector; 24 or 13.1% were in wholesale or retail sales or the repair of motor vehicles, 45 or 24.6% were in the movement and storage of goods, 19 or 10.4% were in a hotel or restaurant, 22 or 12.0% were in the information industry, 12 or 6.6% were technical professionals or scientists, 28 or 15.3% were in education and 9 or 4.9% were in health care.

In 2000, there were 202 workers who commuted into the municipality and 1,031 workers who commuted away. The municipality is a net exporter of workers, with about 5.1 workers leaving the municipality for every one entering. Of the working population, 31.6% used public transportation to get to work, and 47.9% used a private car.

== Religion ==
From the 2000 census, 314 or 12.7% were Roman Catholic, while 1,749 or 70.5% belonged to the Swiss Reformed Church. Of the rest of the population, there were 9 members of an Orthodox church (or about 0.36% of the population), there was 1 individual who belongs to the Christian Catholic Church, and there were 155 individuals (or about 6.24% of the population) who belonged to another Christian church. There was 1 individual who was Jewish, and 32 (or about 1.29% of the population) who were Islamic. There were 3 individuals who were Buddhist and 3 individuals who were Hindu. 217 (or about 8.74% of the population) belonged to no church, are agnostic or atheist, and 73 individuals (or about 2.94% of the population) did not answer the question.

== Education ==
In Meikirch about 979 or (39.4%) of the population have completed non-mandatory upper secondary education, and 514 or (20.7%) have completed additional higher education (either university or a Fachhochschule). Of the 514 who completed tertiary schooling, 66.7% were Swiss men, 27.4% were Swiss women, 3.7% were non-Swiss men and 2.1% were non-Swiss women.

The Canton of Bern school system provides one year of non-obligatory Kindergarten, followed by six years of Primary school. This is followed by three years of obligatory lower Secondary school where the students are separated according to ability and aptitude. Following the lower Secondary students may attend additional schooling or they may enter an apprenticeship.

During the 2009–10 school year, there were a total of 214 students attending classes in Meikirch. There were 2 kindergarten classes with a total of 35 students in the municipality. Of the kindergarten students, 11.4% were permanent or temporary residents of Switzerland (not citizens) and 11.4% have a different mother language than the classroom language. The municipality had 6 primary classes and 93 students. Of the primary students, 7.5% were permanent or temporary residents of Switzerland (not citizens) and 5.4% have a different mother language than the classroom language. During the same year, there were 4 lower secondary classes with a total of 81 students. There were 8.6% who were permanent or temporary residents of Switzerland (not citizens) and 4.9% have a different mother language than the classroom language.

As of 2000, there were 4 students in Meikirch who came from another municipality, while 149 residents attended schools outside the municipality.
