= Münchenbuchsee =

- Municipality
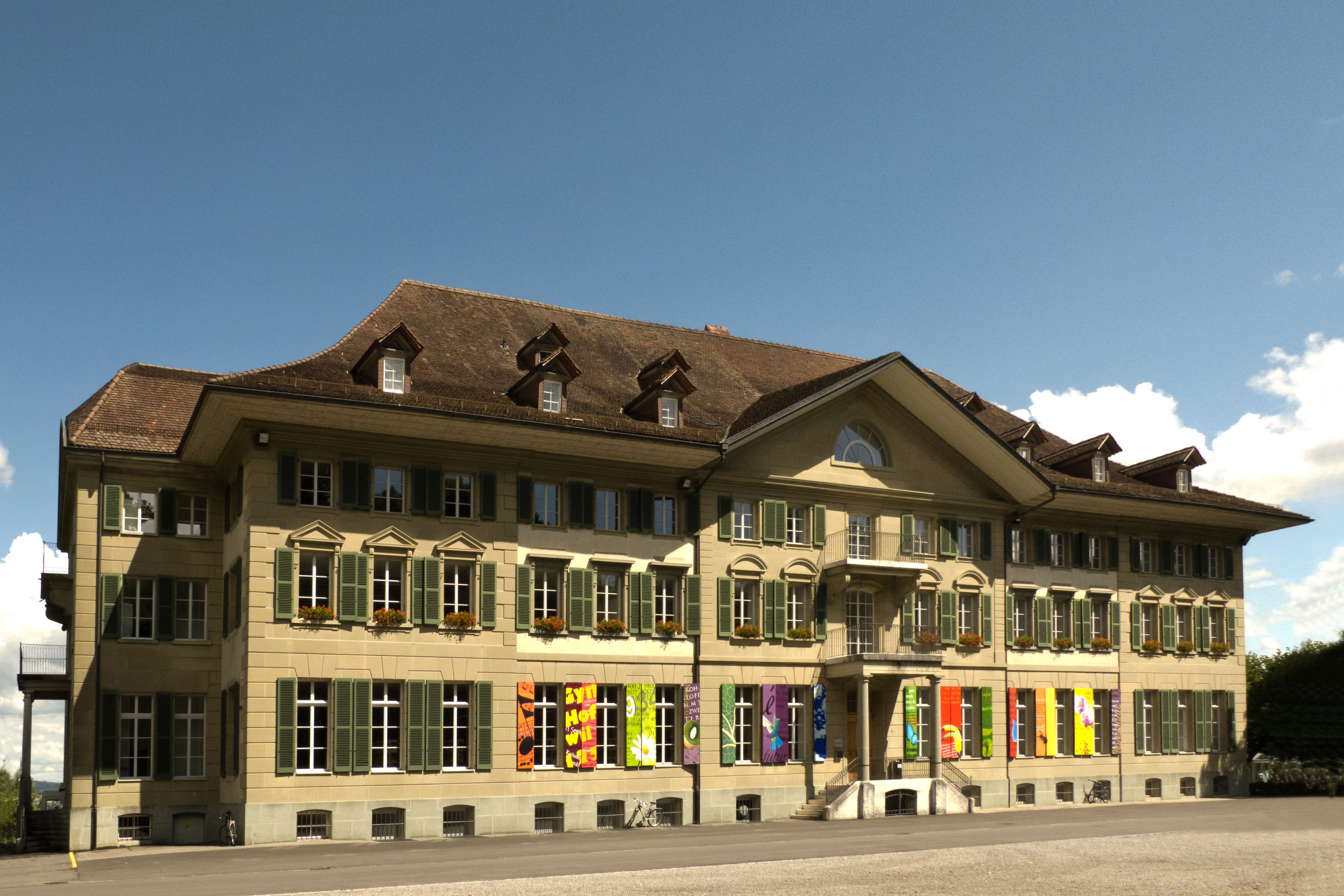

- Flag Coat of arms
- Location of Münchenbuchsee
- Location within Switzerland Location within Canton of Bern
- Coordinates: 47°1′N 7°27′E
- Country: Switzerland
- Canton: Bern
- District: Bern-Mittelland

Government
  - Executive: Gemeinderat with 7 members
  - Mayor: Gemeindepräsident; Manfred Waibel SVP/UDC
  - Parliament: Grosser Gemeinderat with 40 members

Area
  - Total: 8.9 km^{2} (3.4 sq mi)
- Elevation: 564 m (1,850 ft)

Population (December 2020)
  - Total: 10,233
  - Density: 1,100/km^{2} (3,000/sq mi)
- Time zone: UTC+01:00 (CET)
  - Summer (DST): UTC+02:00 (CEST)
- Postal code: 3053
- SFOS number: 546
- ISO 3166 code: CH-BE
- Localities: Hofwil
- Surrounded by: Bolligen, Deisswil bei Münchenbuchsee, Diemerswil, Ittigen, Kirchlindach, Moosseedorf, Rapperswil, Schüpfen, Wiggiswil, Zollikofen
- Twin towns: Landiswil (Switzerland), Milevsko (Czech Republic)
- Website: https://www.muenchenbuchsee.ch/

Münchenbuchsee is a municipality in the Bern-Mittelland administrative district in the canton of Bern in Switzerland. It is famous as the birthplace of the painter Paul Klee.

On 1 January 2023 the former municipality of Diemerswil merged to form the municipality of Münchenbuchsee.

== History ==
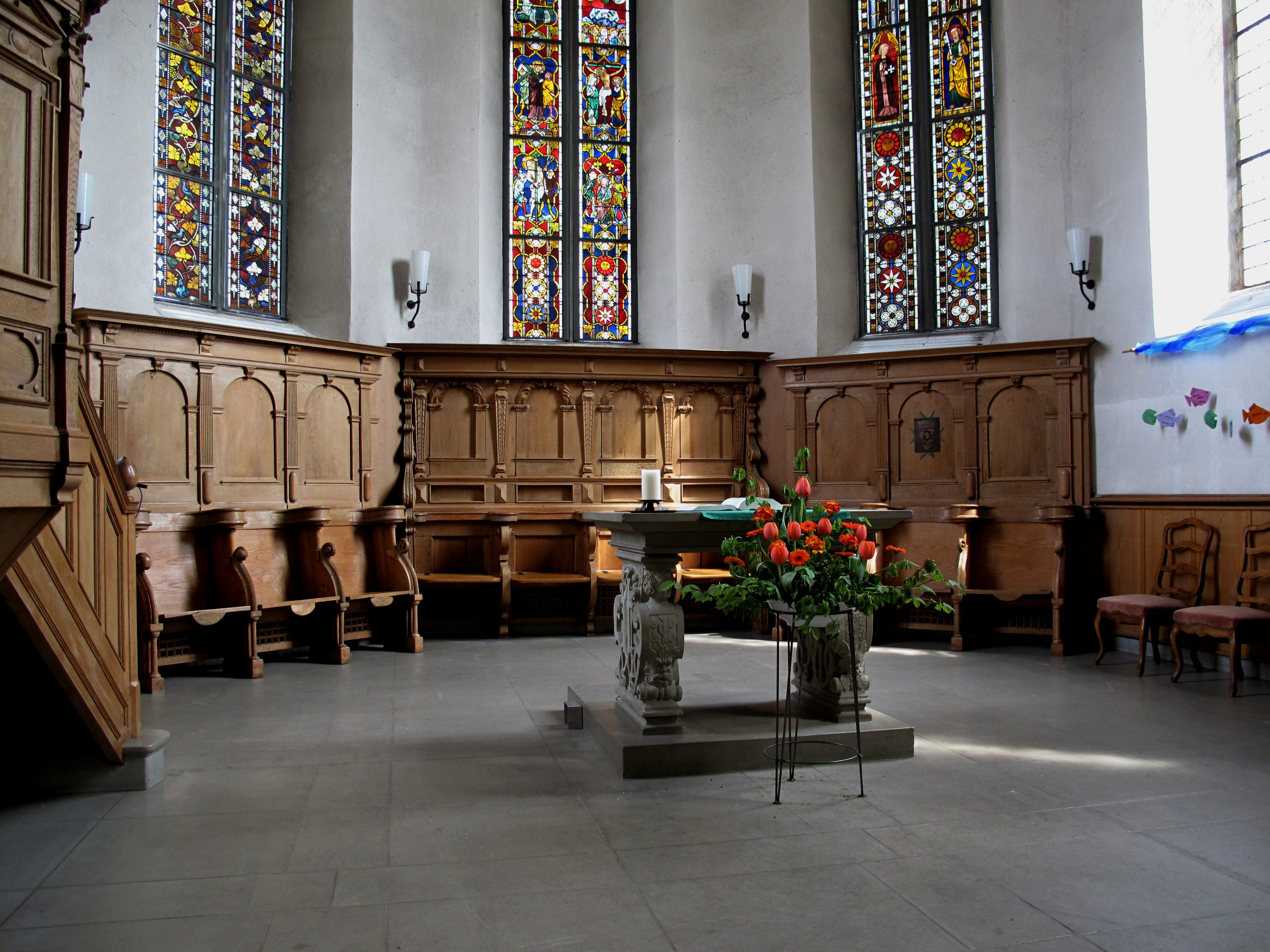
Choir with stained glass of Münchenbuchsee's Commandery Church

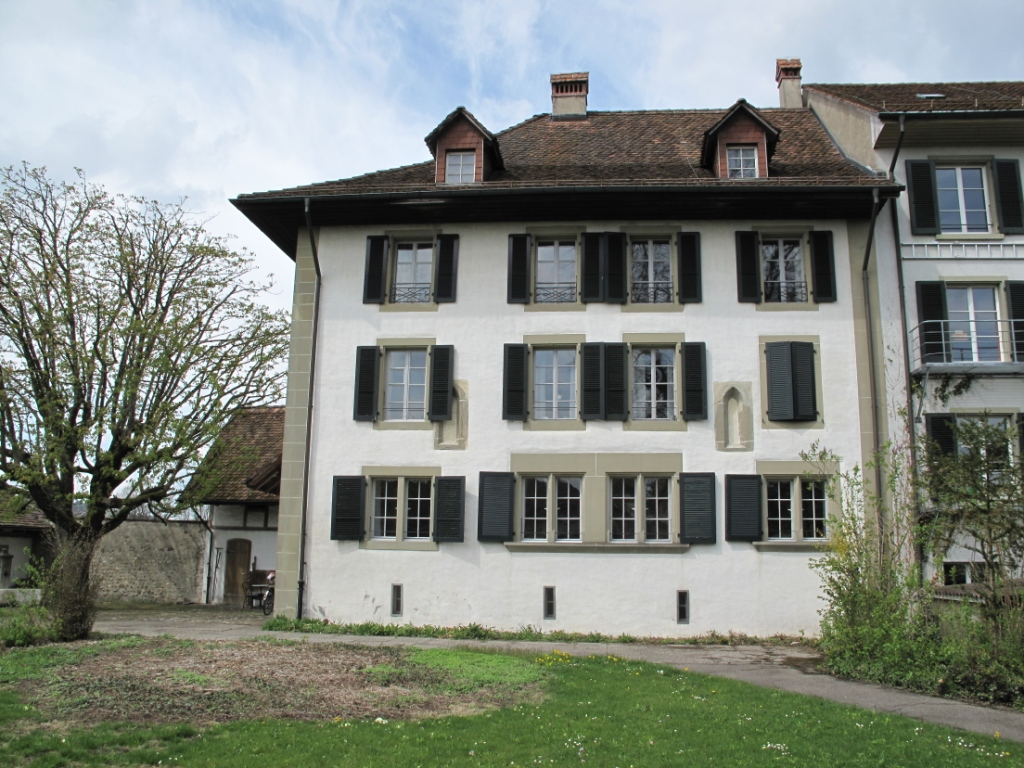
Münchenbuchsee Commandery building

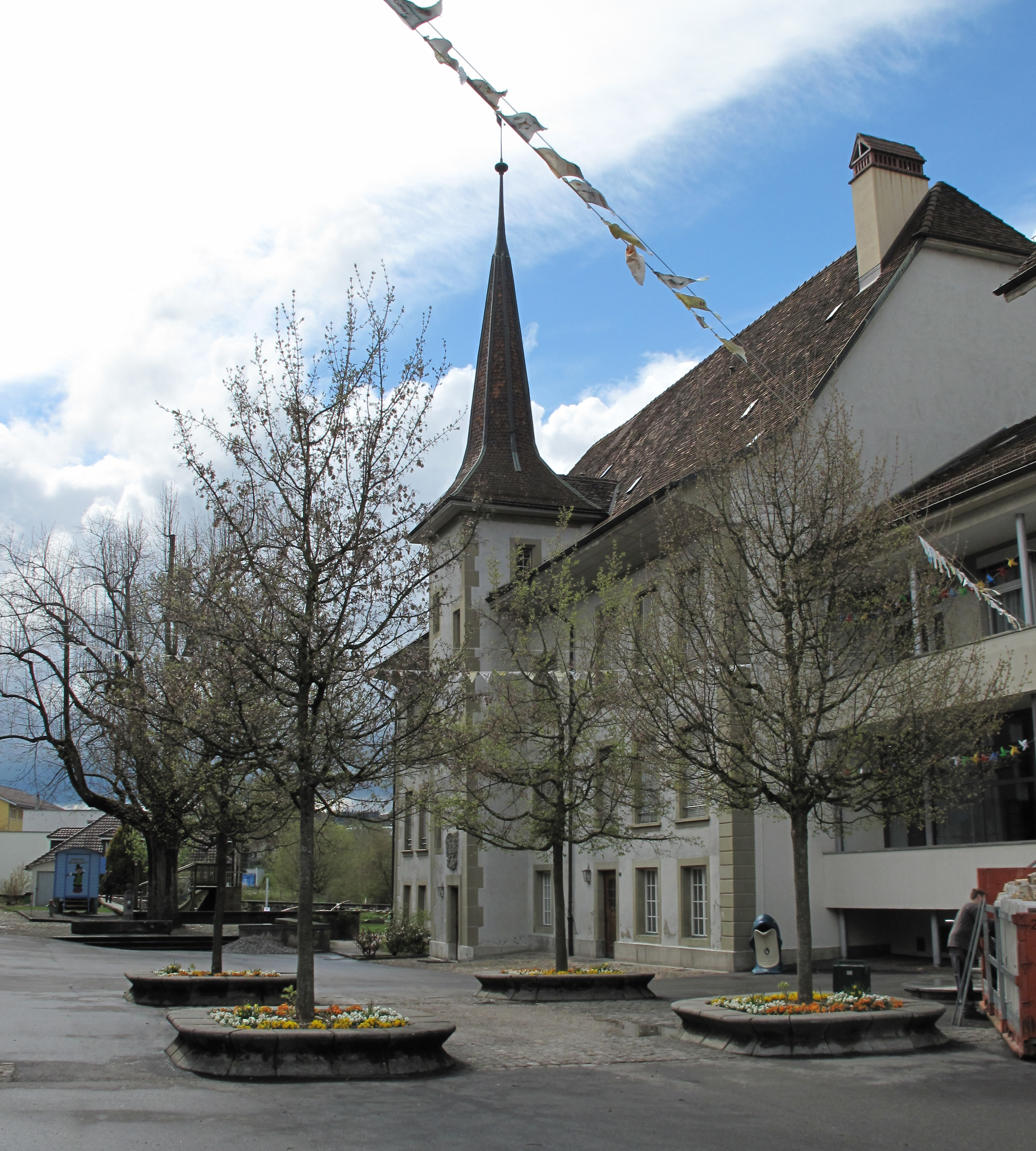
Münchenbuchsee Castle

Aerial view from 200 m by Walter Mittelholzer (1924)

Münchenbuchsee is first mentioned in a deed of donation in 1180 as Buhse (in Swiss German it is still known as Buchsi).

The oldest traces of settlements in the area are scattered neolithic and Hallstatt artifacts which were found in the marsh near Moossee Lake. Some Bronze Age items were discovered in Hofwil. Other archeological discoveries include Iron Age and High Medieval earthen fortifications at Schwandenberg, a grave mound and an Early Medieval grave in Hofwilwald.

The knight Kuno von Buchsee donated his entire possessions to the Order of St. John after having returned for the third time from a pilgrimage to Jerusalem. A commandry of the order was established, which subsequently acquired more land and expanded its influence in the area. In 1210 the order built a hospice for pilgrims as well as an infirmary and a big kitchen. For more than 350 years the members of the order distributed food to the poor twice a week.

Münchenbuchsee Commandery's seal was first documented in 1264. In 1329, the residents of the Commandery became citizens of Bern. The south side of the courtyard included Kuno's castle, the church and a residential building. The choir of the Commandery Church was built in 1260-80 while the stained glass is from the 13th century. The north side of the courtyard had the "summer house", the guesthouse and workshops. The religious community was small, by 1480 only the commander, the prior and six brothers lived there. Due to close family ties between the noble commanders at Münchenbuchsee and Thunstetten Commandery, the two houses became tied together. At times the prior at Thunstetten would appoint a representative to administer the smaller Commandery at Münchenbuchsee.

During the Protestant Reformation in 1528, Commander Peter Englisberg supported the secularization of the Commandery and received Bremgarten Castle as a reward. After the Reformation in 1528, the State of Bern (today canton of Bern) dissolved the commandry and established a Landvogtei, which is quite similar with the English office of reeve. Between 1600 and 1620 the Landvogtei's Castle and a tithe barn were built on the north side of the courtyard. The bailiff ruled over the village until the 1798 French invasion and the creation of the Helvetic Republic. With the Act of Mediation in 1803, the village was assigned to the new district of Fraubrunnen.

Münchenbuchsee was partially destroyed by a fire in 1770. In response, 59 municipalities and 22 private organizations helped to rebuild the village by donating wood, grain and money. Subsequently, the first fire-engine was bought and a night watchman was hired.

The first project to drain the marshy land around the lake began in 1780. In 1855-56 a construction project dropped the level of the lake and opened up new farm land. Another project in 1917-20 drained much of the remaining marsh near the village.

Münchenbuchsee had always been tightly connected to the nearby city of Bern. During the 19th and 20th centuries new transportation links tied it even more closely. In 1844-46 the Bern-Lyss cantonal road was built through Münchenbuchsee. This was followed by the Münchenbuchsee-Zollikofen railroad station in 1857 and the Münchenbuchsee station in 1864 as the Bern-Olten and then Bern-Biel rail lines opened. In 1916 the Bern-Solothurn-Zollikofen Railway (now Bern-Solothurn Regional) built a station in Zollikofen which provided another link.

Münchenbuchsee expanded constantly during the 20th century. In 1953 the Allmend district was built along the border with Zollikofen, followed by the Waldegg district in the 1960s. Both developments were conceived as both residential and commercial zones. The diverse job opportunities and good transportation links caused the population to skyrocket after 1965. The many new residential neighborhoods required the municipality to expand and update the infrastructure. Two new schools opened, the original secondary school (built in 1858) was replaced, the Sports Center Hirzenfeld opened in 1982 followed by the Leisure Center in 1985. The deaf-mute school opened in the castle in 1890 and has grown into the Pedagogic Centre for Hearing and Speech Münchenbuchsee (formally Cantonal School for Speech Impaired). The School for the Hearing and Speech Impaired along with the Sonderschulheim Mätteli (opened in 1967) and Psychiatric Clinic of Wyss (opened 1845) are all of national importance.

== Geography ==
Münchenbuchsee has an area of 8.81 km^{2} (3.40 sq mi). Of this area, 3.42 km^{2} (1.32 mi^{2}) or 38.8% is used for agricultural purposes, while 2.4 km^{2} (0.93 mi^{2}) or 27.2% is forested. Of the rest of the land, 3.05 km^{2} (1.18 mi^{2}) or 34.6% is settled (buildings or roads), 0.03 km^{2} (7.4 acres) or 0.3% is either rivers or lakes.

Of the built up area, industrial buildings made up 4.2% of the total area while housing and buildings made up 13.7% and transportation infrastructure made up 7.8%. Power and water infrastructure as well as other special developed areas made up 1.1% of the area while parks, green belts and sports fields made up 7.7%. Out of the forested land, all of the forested land area is covered with heavy forests. Of the agricultural land, 30.4% is used for growing crops and 7.1% is pastures, while 1.2% is used for orchards or vine crops. All the water in the municipality is flowing water.

Münchenbuchsee is roughly 10 km (6.2 mi) from Bern in north-westerly direction. The town lies on the transit axis from Bern to Biel. It is located on the southern shore of the Moossee Lake and consists of the village of Münchenbuchsee and the settlement of Hofwil. One of the five schools for the hearing-impaired of Switzerland is located here.

On 31 December 2009 Amtsbezirk Fraubrunnen, the municipality's former district, was dissolved. On the following day, 1 January 2010, it joined the newly created Verwaltungskreis Bern-Mittelland.

== Coat of arms ==
The blazon of the municipal coat of arms is Gules on a Bend Argent nine Box Leaves Vert.

== Demographics ==
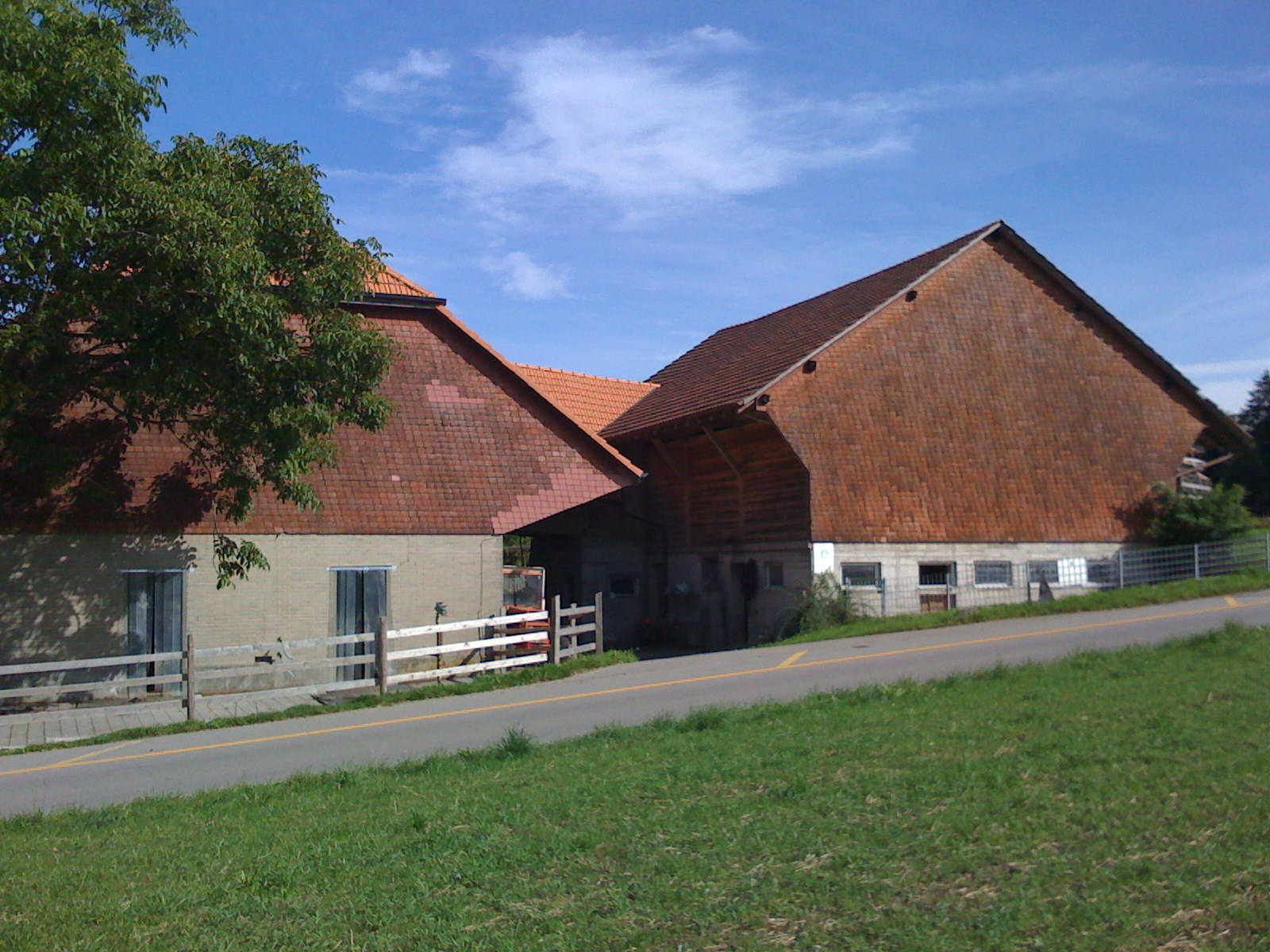
Farm buildings in Münchenbuchsee

Münchenbuchsee has a population (as of December 2020) of 10,233. As of 2010, 13.8% of the population are resident foreign nationals. Over the last 10 years (2000–2010) the population has changed at a rate of 5.6%. Migration accounted for -0.1%, while births and deaths accounted for 4.6%.

Most of the population (as of 2000) speaks German (8,539 or 88.9%) as their first language, Italian is the second most common (196 or 2.0%) and French is the third (145 or 1.5%). There are 8 people who speak Romansh.

As of 2008, the population was 48.9% male and 51.1% female. The population was made up of 4,070 Swiss men (41.6% of the population) and 719 (7.3%) non-Swiss men. There were 4,367 Swiss women (44.6%) and 632 (6.5%) non-Swiss women. Of the population in the municipality, 1,953 or about 20.3% were born in Münchenbuchsee and lived there in 2000. There were 4,253 or 44.3% who were born in the same canton, while 1,656 or 17.2% were born somewhere else in Switzerland, and 1,402 or 14.6% were born outside of Switzerland.

As of 2010, children and teenagers (0–19 years old) make up 21.9% of the population, while adults (20–64 years old) make up 62.3% and seniors (over 64 years old) make up 15.8%.

As of 2000, there were 4,106 people who were single and never married in the municipality. There were 4,630 married individuals, 400 widows or widowers and 473 individuals who are divorced.

As of 2000, there were 1,250 households that consist of only one person and 216 households with five or more people. In 2000, a total of 3,927 apartments (92.8% of the total) were permanently occupied, while 223 apartments (5.3%) were seasonally occupied and 81 apartments (1.9%) were empty. The vacancy rate for the municipality, in 2011, was 1.17%.

The historical population is given in the following chart:

== Heritage sites of national significance ==
The swimming pool at Hofwil, the Hofwil Institution and Hofwil Castle are listed as Swiss heritage site of national significance. The entire area around Hofwil is part of the Inventory of Swiss Heritage Sites.

The Hofwil Institution was built by Philipp Emanuel von Fellenberg, a Bernese patrician. He took over the estate of Hofwyl in 1798 and transformed it into several schools to educate all levels of society. He established a school for the poor, a secondary school for local students and an institute for the sons of wealthy families throughout Europe. The Hofwil Institution building was built in 1817–21 as a center piece of Emanuel von Fellenberg's educational vision. The outbuildings were built in 1818, followed by a teacher's house in 1819 and another school building around 1820. The Canton of Bern bought the building in 1884 to establish a teacher's college. After multiple renovations, in 1970 the building once again became an institute. This time it was a music institute for the 10th through 12th grade. The building also houses an optional boarding school for students.

Hofwil Castle was built in 1784–86 by the architect Carl Ahasver von Sinner for Gabriel Albrecht von Erlach. A peristyle was added to the neo-classical building in 1798.

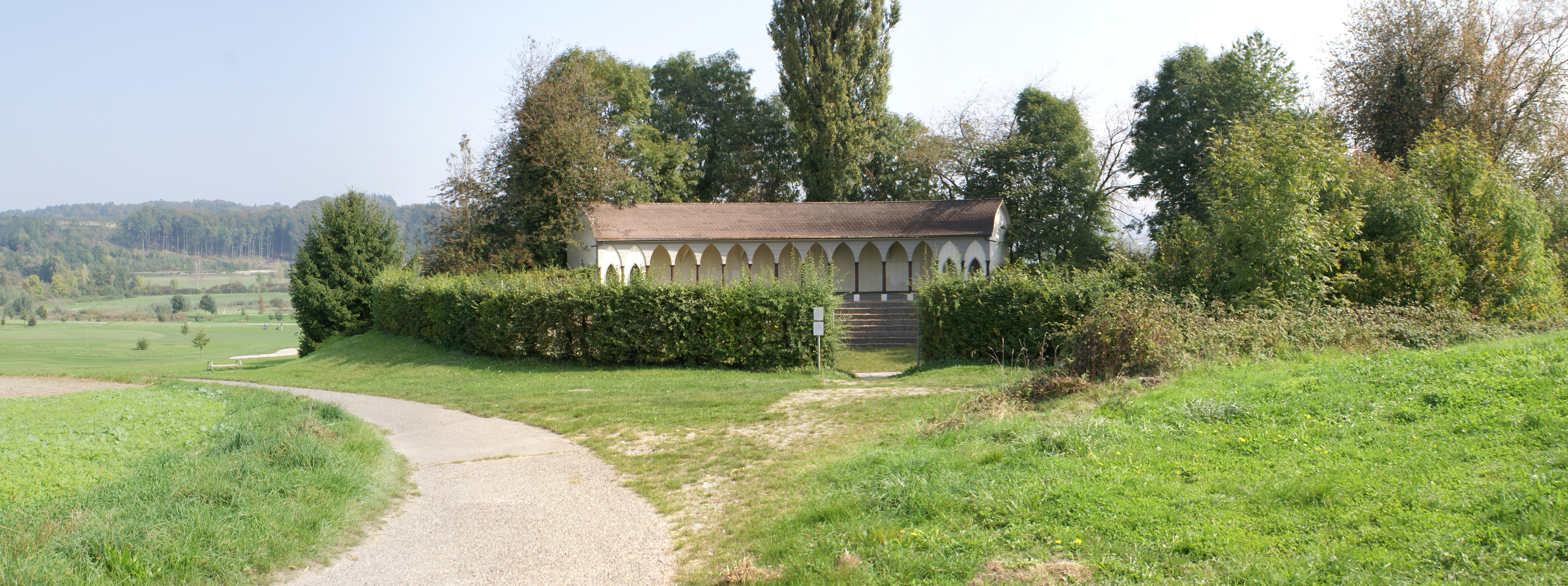
Hofwil Swimming Facility

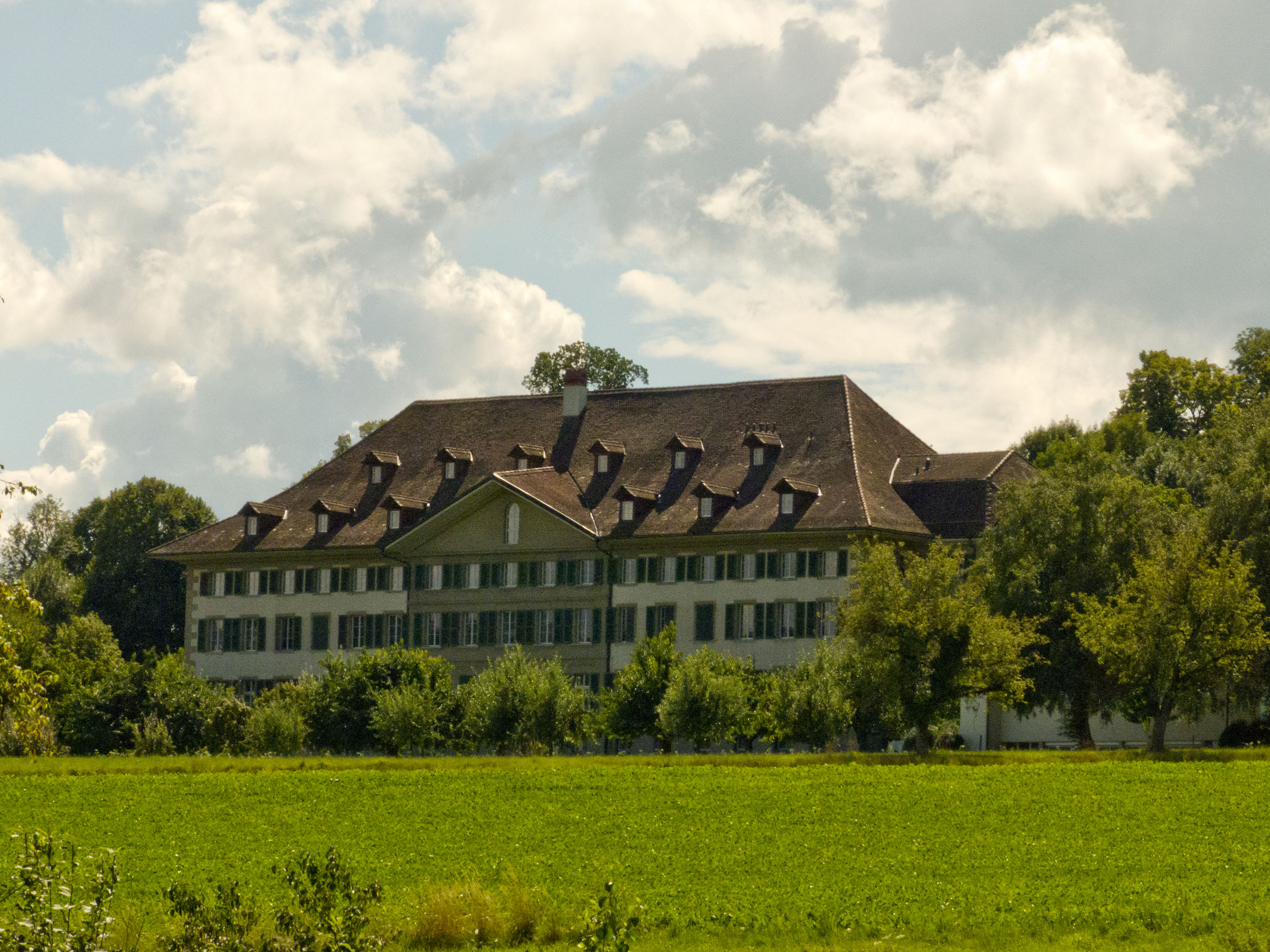
Hofwil Institution

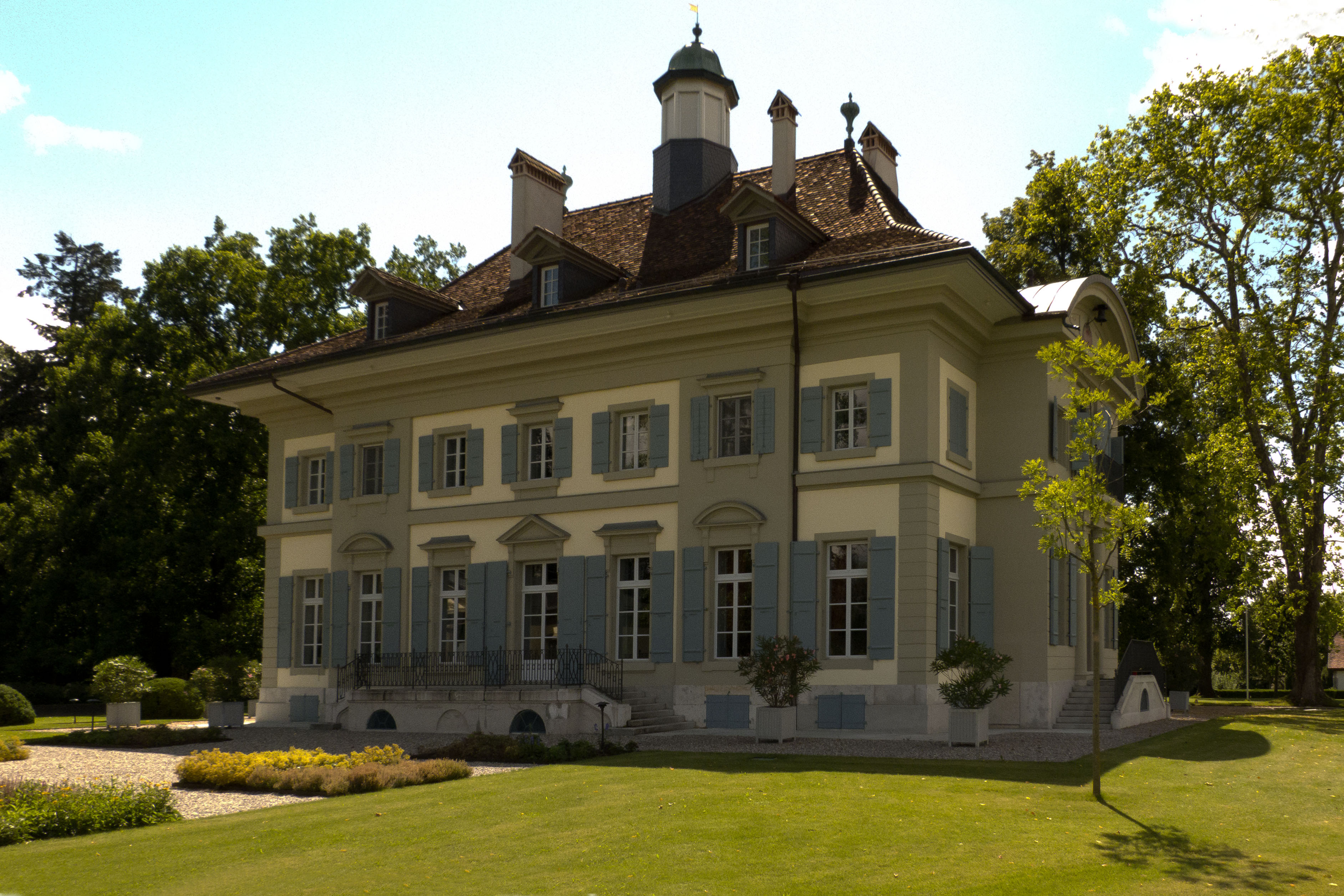
Hofwil Castle

== Politics ==
In the 2011 federal election the most popular party was the Swiss People's Party (SVP) which received 23.9% of the vote. The next three most popular parties were the Social Democratic Party (SP) (21.3%), the Conservative Democratic Party (BDP) (16%) and the Green Party (9.1%). In the federal election, a total of 3,534 votes were cast, and the voter turnout was 51.4%.

== Economy ==
As of 2011, Münchenbuchsee had an unemployment rate of 1.9%. As of 2008, there were a total of 5,217 people employed in the municipality. Of these, there were 50 people employed in the primary economic sector and about 10 businesses involved in this sector. 1,361 people were employed in the secondary sector and there were 74 businesses in this sector. 3,806 people were employed in the tertiary sector, with 287 businesses in this sector. There were 5,290 residents of the municipality who were employed in some capacity, of which females made up 45.1% of the workforce.

In 2008 there were a total of 4,402 full-time equivalent jobs. The number of jobs in the primary sector was 25, of which 19 were in agriculture and 6 were in forestry or lumber production. The number of jobs in the secondary sector was 1,241 of which 886 or (71.4%) were in manufacturing and 306 (24.7%) were in construction. The number of jobs in the tertiary sector was 3,136. In the tertiary sector; 997 or 31.8% were in wholesale or retail sales or the repair of motor vehicles, 332 or 10.6% were in the movement and storage of goods, 120 or 3.8% were in a hotel or restaurant, 476 or 15.2% were in the information industry, 137 or 4.4% were technical professionals or scientists, 142 or 4.5% were in education and 532 or 17.0% were in health care.

In 2000, there were 2,568 workers who commuted into the municipality and 3,876 workers who commuted away. The municipality is a net exporter of workers, with about 1.5 workers leaving the municipality for every one entering. Of the working population, 37.2% used public transportation to get to work, and 40.5% used a private car.

== Religion ==
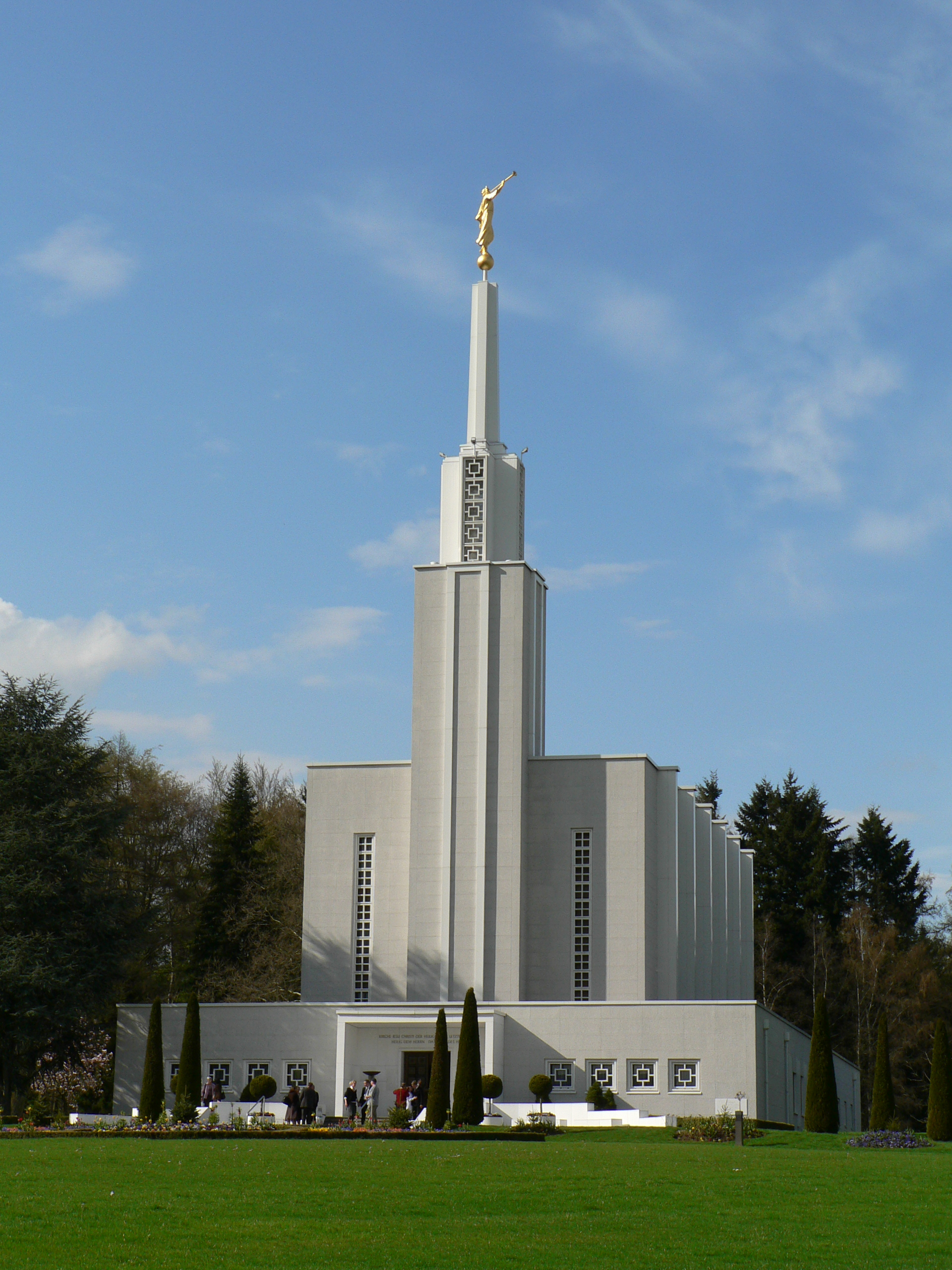
The LDS temple in Buchsee, also the oldest in Europe.

From the 2000 census, 1,647 or 17.1% were Roman Catholic, while 5,833 or 60.7% belonged to the Swiss Reformed Church. Of the rest of the population, there were 228 members of an Orthodox church (or about 2.37% of the population), there were 4 individuals (or about 0.04% of the population) who belonged to the Christian Catholic Church, and there were 796 individuals (or about 8.28% of the population) who belonged to another Christian church. There was 1 individual who was Jewish, and 384 (or about 4.00% of the population) who were Islamic. There were 39 individuals who were Buddhist, 52 individuals who were Hindu and 16 individuals who belonged to another church. 683 (or about 7.11% of the population) belonged to no church, are agnostic or atheist, and 322 individuals (or about 3.35% of the population) did not answer the question.

== Education ==
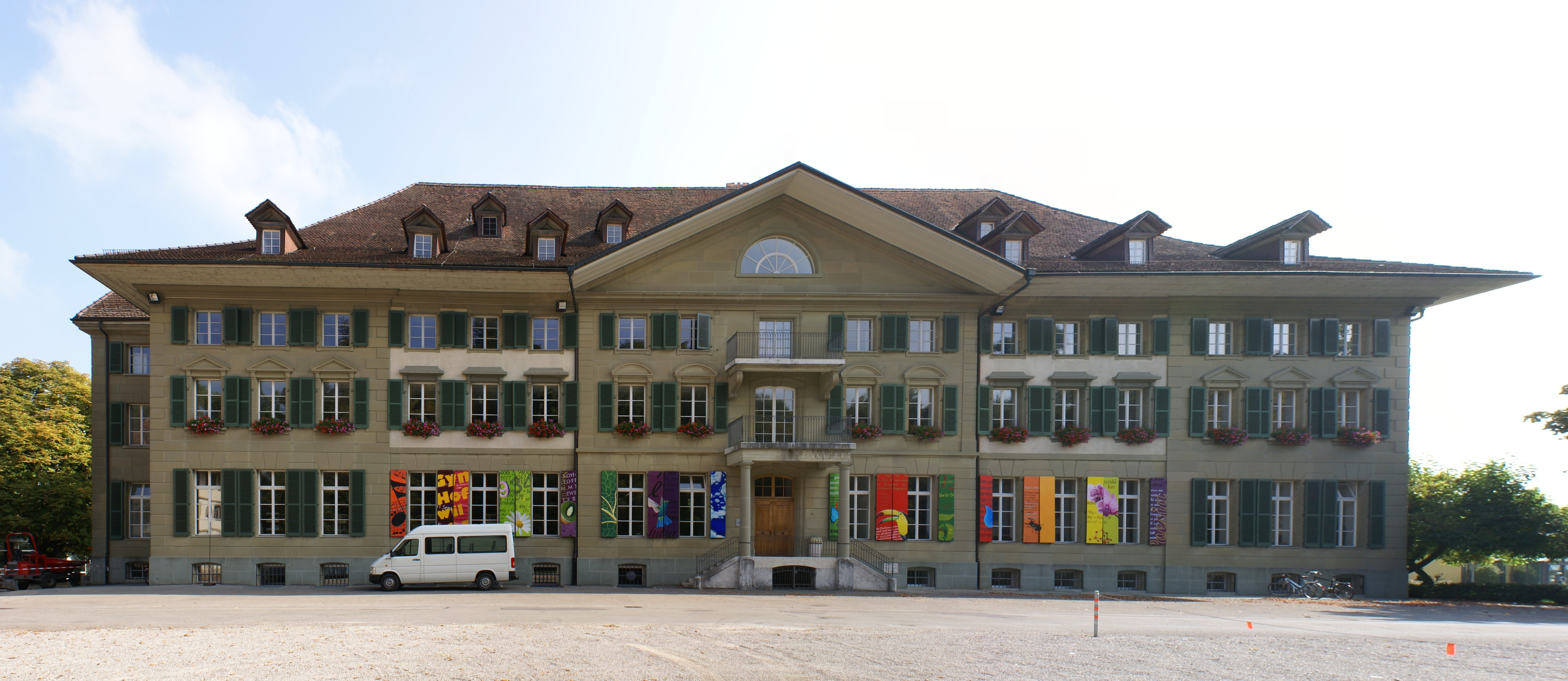
Hofwil Secondary School

In Münchenbuchsee about 4,044 or (42.1%) of the population have completed non-mandatory upper secondary education, and 1,280 or (13.3%) have completed additional higher education (either university or a Fachhochschule). Of the 1,280 who completed tertiary schooling, 69.7% were Swiss men, 20.9% were Swiss women, 5.9% were non-Swiss men and 3.4% were non-Swiss women.

The Canton of Bern school system provides one year of non-obligatory Kindergarten, followed by six years of Primary school. This is followed by three years of obligatory lower Secondary school where the students are separated according to ability and aptitude. Following the lower Secondary students may attend additional schooling or they may enter an apprenticeship.

During the 2010–11 school year, there were a total of 1,411 students attending classes in Münchenbuchsee. There were 15 kindergarten classes with a total of 205 students in the municipality. Of the kindergarten students, 19.0% were permanent or temporary residents of Switzerland (not citizens) and 31.7% have a different mother language than the classroom language. The municipality had 32 primary classes and 603 students. Of the primary students, 16.3% were permanent or temporary residents of Switzerland (not citizens) and 28.0% have a different mother language than the classroom language. During the same year, there were 22 lower secondary classes with a total of 418 students. There were 13.2% who were permanent or temporary residents of Switzerland (not citizens) and 18.4% have a different mother language than the classroom language.

As of 2000, there were 420 students in Münchenbuchsee who came from another municipality, while 270 residents attended schools outside the municipality.

== Climate ==
Munchenbuchsee has a Marine West Coast climate (Cfb) under the Köppen climate classification. The average annual temperature is 7 °C (44 °F). The average coldest month was January with an average temperature of −3 °C (26 °F), while the warmest month was July with an average temperature of 18 °C (64 °F). The wettest month was August during which time Munchenbuchsee received an average of 100 millimeters (4 in) of rain or snow. The driest month was February where Munchenbuchsee received an average of 58 millimeters (2.3 in) of precipitation.

Climate data for Munchenbuchsee
Month	Jan	Feb	Mar	Apr	May	Jun	Jul	Aug	Sep	Oct	Nov	Dec	Year
Daily mean °C (°F)	−3 (26)	0 (32)	3 (37)	8 (46)	12 (53)	16 (60)	18 (64)	16 (60)	13 (55)	8 (46)	2 (35)	0 (32)	7 (44)
Average precipitation mm (inches)	69 (2.7)	58 (2.3)	64 (2.5)	66 (2.6)	81 (3.2)	99 (3.9)	89 (3.5)	100 (4)	89 (3.5)	81 (3.2)	84 (3.3)	76 (3)	960 (37.7)

== Notable people ==
- Livia Maria Chiariello (2005 in Münchenbuchsee), a Swiss rhythmic gymnast
- Heinrich Morf (1854 in Münchenbuchsee – 1921), a Swiss linguist and literary historian
- Paul Klee (1879 in Münchenbuchsee – 1940), a Swiss German artist, influenced by expressionism, cubism, and surrealism
- Otto Schneider-Orelli (1880 in Münchenbuchsee – 1965), a Swiss entomologist
- Stephan Eicher (born 1960 in Münchenbuchsee), a Swiss post- punk, pop music singer
