= Thames Park Secondary School =

- The building currently occupied by Thames Park

Location
- Chadwell Road; Grays, Essex, RM17 5FP; England; 51.4836°N 0.3555°E

Information
- Type: Co-operative free school
- Established: 1 September 2020
- Local authority: Thurrock Council
- Specialists: Digital technology and artificial intelligence
- Department for Education URN: 147853 Tables
- Ofsted: Reports
- Chairman: Mike Fall
- Executive Headteacher: Ashlie Hughes
- Headteacher: Sam Dyer
- Staff: 12
- Gender: Coeducational
- Age: 11 to 16
- Enrolment: 613
- Capacity: 900
- Houses: Terra; Ventus; Silva; Aqua
- Colours: Green and navy blue
- Affiliation: St Clere's School
- Website: www.thamespark.org.uk

Thames Park Secondary School is a co-operative, comprehensive and coeducational secondary free school in Grays, Essex, England. It opened in September 2020 as a member of the Osborne Co-operative Academy Trust (OCAT) and is a specialist school for digital technology and artificial intelligence. The school was previously located on a temporary site at High Street, Grays, before its relocation to Chadwell Road in September 2022. The school's headteacher is Sam Dyer and the executive headteacher is Ashlie Hughes. Ashlie Hughes is the headteacher of Thames Park's sister school, St Clere's.

== History ==
In 2017, Thurrock Council approved four free school applications made to combat Thurrock's rapidly growing population. These included the Orsett Heath Academy, Treetops Free School and Thames Park Secondary School. Thames Park's creation was to be overseen by the Osborne Co-operative Academy Trust, providing Thurrock places for another 900 students. The school would design its logo and brand with the help of design agency Periscope. The logo's four elements would represent ripples in the River Thames and local parks, green belt areas, industry and agriculture. In 2019, the Department for Education began funding the construction of the school, which would be located adjacent to Palmer's College. Originally the school was planned to be built on Elm Road but these plans were dropped. In the meantime, the school would temporarily be housed in a building previously used by South Essex College's Grays campus. In August 2020, the Department for Education appointed development company Bowmer and Kirkland to construct the school's permanent site and plans were drafted. The plans prioritised the school's specialism in digital technology and were praised as being "state-of-the-art" by the school's first headteacher, Kam Bains.

The school opened to its first intake at its temporary site in September 2020 through a ceremony which included a live video-link speech by Angela Smith of Basildon. The plans for its permanent site were submitted a month later, gaining approval from Thurrock Council in March 2021, with a DfE investment of £22 million. The school's permanent site began construction in July 2021 and was completed by August 2022, and it opened to students in September of that year.

== Structure and curriculum ==
The school is split between four houses, each named in Latin after the elements of the school logo they are coloured after. They are Aqua (blue), Silva (green), Terra (red) and Ventus (yellow). The names were decided through a student "name the houses" competition.Won by student Aiden. The houses hold assemblies, school-wide events and competitions against each other. Each house is led by a head of house, who appears to usually be a student. The school is managed by a local governing body consisting of the school's stakeholders, the OCAT board of directors and school governors. Governors consist of staff, parents and members of the local community. Parent governors are elected every four years and all parents may run for election. The school is currently chaired by community governor Mike Fall. The senior leadership team controls the school under the oversight of the governing body and consists of the headteacher and his assistant. There is also a student council and forum and a platform for parents and students to complain.

The school offers a "broad and balanced" curriculum that specialises in digital technology and artificial intelligence. As a result, the school has invested in providing free Chromebooks to each student for use in lessons. This is so that the school "can extensively use digital education platforms in a way that most schools cannot." The curriculum is "delivered using a blended learning model." For example, the school has a unique graphics subject that is provided to years 7 and 8. The curriculum also embeds relationship and sex education. Parents can opt their children out of sex education but cannot do the same for relationship education. MFL education for French and Spanish is offered, with Spanish replacing the school's previous provision of design technology in 2022. The school is part of Thurrock Trailblazer, a school programme run by the Royal Opera House that encourages provision in the arts and culture. The programme has allowed Thames Park to hold a number of workshops and collaborate on multiple projects with fellow OCAT schools.

Classes in the school consist of around 30 pupils with 180 pupils per year group.

== School site ==
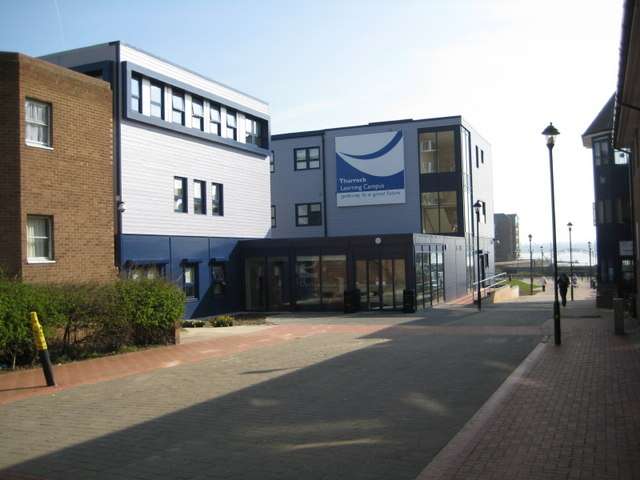
Building occupied by the school's temporary site

The school's temporary site was located on High Street, Grays and was a 5-minute walk from Grays railway station. It was also accessible from Argent Street which had a public car-park and was next to the Grays Town Wharf. The site's building was previously used by South Essex College's Grays campus and for office accommodation. Before the September 2020 opening, the building was extensively modified and redeveloped, being completed by the end of July. Fire exits were built for the school and medical services were facilitated. A multi-use games area was also built and the building was described as being "spacious" by Ofsted. SEND requirements dictated by the Equality Act 2010 were fulfilled by the provision of lifts for students.

The school's permanent site is located on Chadwell Road, Grays and is adjacent to Palmer's College. It takes up 18 acres of land between Wood View Road and Dock Road and was built by Bowmer and Kirkland. Construction began in July 2021 and finished in August 2022. It has a capacity of 900 and consists of two main blocks; the sports block and the teaching block. Within these buildings is a sports hall, main hall, departmental "zones" and an external multi-use games area accompanied by pitches. At the site's centre is an extracurricular learning resource centre. The public have been granted right of way and the option to use school facilities outside of the school day. Both vehicular and non-vehicular entry appears to be centred from Wood View Road. In light of this, proposals have been made for a new crossing to be built on the road so that students can be encouraged to walk or cycle to the school. The costs of the site were paid for by the DfE, who allocated £22 million for its construction.

== Headteachers ==
- Sam Dyer (2023–present)
- Kam Bains (2020–2023)
- Ashlie Hughes (executive 2020–present, also the headteacher of St Clere's School)
