= Theodor Müller =

German pedagogue and school reformer in Switzerland (1790–1857)

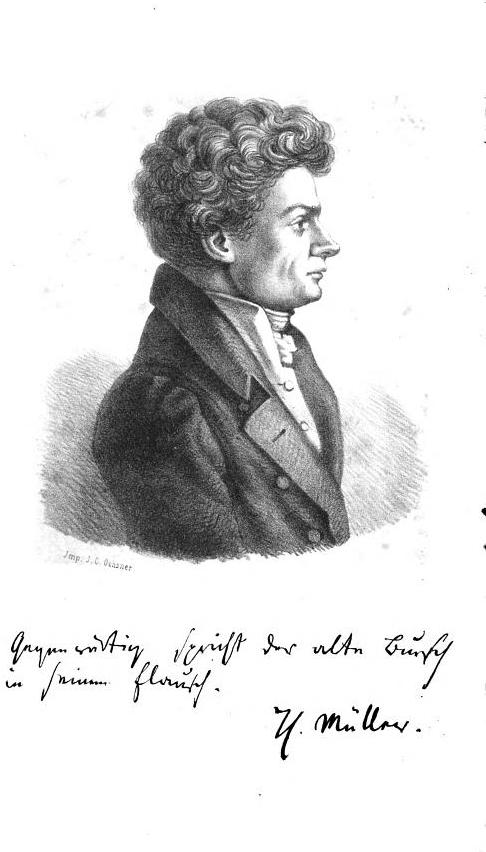
- Born: Viktor Bernhard Theodor Müller; November 12, 1790; Strelitz-Alt, Duchy of Mecklenburg-Strelitz
- Died: July 23, 1857 (aged 66); Hofwil, Bern, Switzerland
- Occupations: Pedagogue, school reformer
- Known for: Deutsche Sprachlehre, zunächst für Berner Volksschulen (1838)

Theodor Müller (born Viktor Bernhard Theodor Müller; 12 November 1790 – 23 July 1857) was a German pedagogue and school reformer who spent most of his career in Switzerland. He is best known for his German grammar textbook Deutsche Sprachlehre, zunächst für Berner Volksschulen (1838), which was widely adopted in Bernese schools and went through multiple editions.

== Early life and education ==
Theodor Müller grew up in a lower middle class family in Strelitz-Alt, in the Duchy of Mecklenburg-Strelitz. His father, Friedrich Philipp Müller, worked as both a teacher and notary, while his mother died prematurely. Beginning his studies in Protestant theology at the University of Jena in 1810, Müller joined a student association in 1811 and embraced patriotic ideas. Financial difficulties forced him to interrupt his studies in 1812, after which he returned home and passed the examination to become a pastor, while working as a private tutor.

== Career at Hofwil ==
In July 1815, Philipp Emanuel von Fellenberg, director of the Hofwil institute, offered Müller a teaching position based on recommendations from his former fellow students Ulrich Becker and Friedrich Kortüm, both professors at the institute. Arriving at Hofwil at the end of 1815, Müller initially took over part of the religious education courses and later taught history. Apart from brief interruptions—including studies at Heidelberg in 1819 and teaching assignments at the Pädagogium in Basel in 1822 and in Morat in 1838—he worked in all sections of the Hofwil institute until its closure following Fellenberg's death in 1844.

Although marked by mutual respect, the relationship between Fellenberg and Müller was tense. However, Müller enjoyed the esteem of the teaching staff due to his good relationships with students. His German grammar textbook Deutsche Sprachlehre, zunächst für Berner Volksschulen (1838) was highly appreciated and quickly sold out, leading to multiple reprints. After the first edition, it was introduced at Hofwil and shortly thereafter in Bernese rural schools.

After the Canton of Bern refused to take over the Hofwil institute in 1838, Müller approached Albert Bitzius in 1839, asking for his support to ensure the institution's continuity. Bitzius initially reacted with caution due to his differences with Fellenberg, but eventually formed a friendship with Müller. They maintained regular correspondence probably until the end of 1845 and met in inns between Hofwil and Lützelflüh.

== Later career ==
In the final years of his life, Müller continued his commitment to public education in Bern. He served as a gymnasium teacher in Bern, was a member of the Bernese synodal council, and worked as a school inspector until the end of his life.

== Bibliography ==
- Blatter, Christian: Das Berner Volksschulwesen, wie es ist und sein sollte. Eine vom Kantonallehrerverein gekrönte Preisschrift, 1847.
- Pabst, Karl Robert: Der Veteran von Hofwyl, 3 volumes, 1861–1863.
