= St Clere's School =

Location
- Butts Lane; Stanford-le-Hope, Essex, SS17 0NW; England; 51°30′38″N 0°25′10″E

Information
- Type: Co-operative academy
- Motto: Latin: "Persequi Optima" (The Pursuit of Excellence)
- Established: 1973
- Specialists: Science and sports
- Department for Education URN: 137456 Tables
- Ofsted: Reports
- Chair: Dawn Mummery
- Headteacher: Ashlie Hughes
- Deputy Headteacher: Jon Purkiss
- Gender: Coeducational
- Age: 11 to 16
- Enrolment: 1342
- Houses: Brandon; Conrad; Gordon; Wallace
- Colours: Red, yellow, blue, green and black.
- Affiliation: Thames Park Secondary School
- Website: http://www.st-cleres.thurrock.sch.uk/

St Clere's School (formerly St Clere's School and Language College) is a coeducational co-operative secondary school with academy status located on the outskirts of Stanford Le Hope, Thurrock, Essex. The school was established in 1978, became an academy in 2011 and since 2013 has also been a specialist science and sports college. It has a "good" Ofsted rating and has a student population of 1342 as of 2021.

The school is involved with the Jack Petchey Award. It is offered to students in the upper years of the school, being years 9 to 11. It is also a sister school with fellow trust school Thames Park Secondary School, with current Headteacher Ashlie Hughes being the executive head at Thames Park.

== History ==
The St Clere's School opened in 1978 and was one of the first Essexonian schools to be grant-maintained in 1993. It specialised as a language college sometime before 2008 and it became a foundation school in 2009. It became an academy converter on 1 September 2011 and in 2012 formed the St Clere's Co-operative Academy Trust with the nearby East Tilbury Primary School, the first multi-academy trust with co-operative articles of association in the entire country. This trust would be renamed the Osborne Co-operative Academy Trust in 2017 to honour its late Chair Ray Osborne who was a governor at St Clere's since its establishment in 1978 and was the school chair from 1980 and trust chair from 2011. He is said to have missed only one meeting during his whole career, which was a fortnight before his death in 2016.

After gaining academy status it specialised again as a science and sports College in 2013 and was ranked as "good" by Ofsted in 2014. In 2013 it was visited by Baroness Angela Smith of Basildon who was "very impressed" with the school and its fellow trust member East Tilbury Primary School.

In 2023 the school was found to have a number of potentially structurally unsound buildings due to the use of reinforced autoclaved aerated concrete as a building material.

== Sixth Form ==
St Clere's hosts one of two campuses for the Osborne Sixth Form which has around 200 students studying A-Levels and Level 3 BTECs. The other school which makes up the sixth form is Brentwood County High School.

== Notable former pupils ==
- Danielle Jones (murder victim)
- Anne-Marie, singer-songwriter
