= The Last of the Tasmanians =

19th century study of Aboriginal Tasmanians

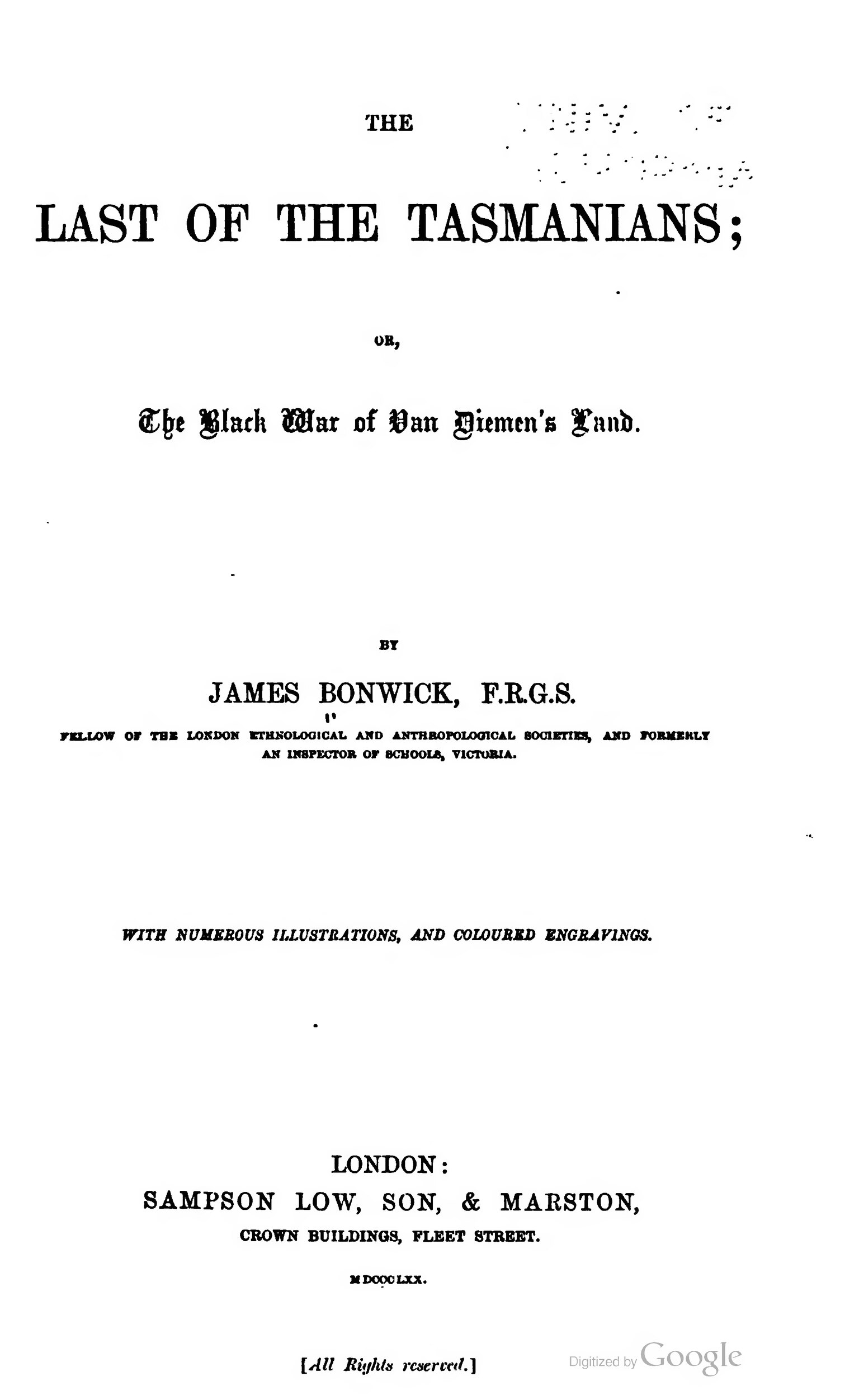
- Title page
- Author: James Bonwick
- Published: London: Sampson Low, Son, & Marston, 1870
- Publication place: United Kingdom
- Pages: 400
- Text: The Last of the Tasmanians at Wikisource

The Last of the Tasmanians; or, The Black War of Van Diemen's Land is an 1870 work of history and anthropology by James Bonwick, which chronicles and attempts to explain the demographic decline of the Aboriginal Tasmanians in the face of British settlement in the 19th century. The book is illuminated with numerous illustrations and coloured engravings.

== Contents ==
- Chapter I. Voyagers Tales of the Tasmanians
- Chapter II. The Black War
- Chapter III. Cruelties to the Blacks
- Chapter IV. Outrages of the Blacks
- Chapter V. The Line
- Chapter VI. Capture Parties
- Chapter VII. George Augustus Robinson, the Conciliator
- Chapter VIII. Flinders Island
- Chapter IX. Oyster Cove
- Chapter X. The Sealers
- Chapter XI. Half-castes
- Chapter XII. Native Rights
- Chapter XIII. Civilization
- Chapter XIV. Decline

== Plagiarised edition ==
A plagiarised edition of Bonwick's work was printed at Sydney by the Shakespeare Head Press in 1973 and attributed to Michael David Davies. The prose was slightly modernised and the work concluded with a new chapter by Davies which speculated on the origins of the indigenous Tasmanians.

== Bibliography ==
- Ferguson, John Alexander (1963). Bibliography of Australia. Vol. 5: 1851–1900 (A–G). Sydney: Angus and Robertson Ltd. pp. 373 (no. 7232).
- Lawson, Tom (2014). The Last Man: A British Genocide in Tasmania. Great Britain: I.B. Tauris & Co. Ltd. pp. 8–9, 36, 129, 154–7, 166, 169.
- Windschuttle, Keith (2005). The Fabrication of Aboriginal History. Vol. 1: Van Diemen's Land 1803–1847. Sydney: Macleay Press. pp. 20, 26–7, 36–7, 54, 101, 127, 149, 168, 230, 281, 284, 376.

== Links ==
- "The last of the Tasmanians, or, The black war of Van Diemen's Land / by James Bonwick". National Library of Australia.
- "The last of the Tasmanians; or, The black war of Van Diemen's Land. / London, Sampson Low, Son, & Marston, 1870". Trove.
- "The last of the Tasmanians / [by] David Davies". National Library of Australia.
- "The last of the Tasmanians / [by] David Davies". Trove.
- Media related to Category:Last of the Tasmanians at Wikimedia Commons
