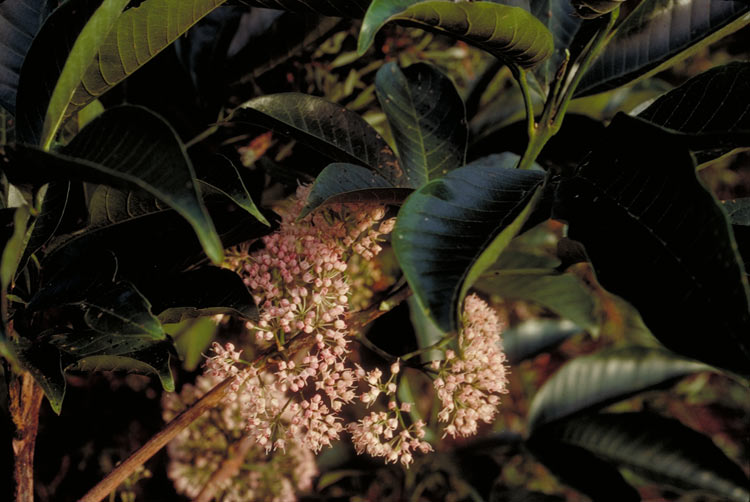

Conservation status
- Least Concern (IUCN 3.1)

Scientific classification
- Kingdom: Plantae
- Clade: Tracheophytes
- Clade: Angiosperms
- Clade: Eudicots
- Clade: Rosids
- Order: Sapindales
- Family: Rutaceae
- Genus: Melicope
- Species: M. bonwickii

Binomial name
- Melicope bonwickii (F.Muell.) T.G.Hartley

Synonyms
- Euodia bonwickii F.Muell.

= Melicope bonwickii =

Yellow evodia

Species of tree

Melicope bonwickii, commonly known as the yellow evodia or yellow corkwood, is a species of tree in the family Rutaceae and is native to Java and the Philippines, and southward to New Guinea and north-eastern Australia. It has trifoliate leaves and small pink flowers borne in panicles in leaf axils.

== Description ==
Melicope bonwickii grows up to 40 metres (130 ft) tall. The leaves are trifoliate on a petiole 30–95 mm (1.2–3.7 in) long, the end leaflet egg-shaped with the narrower end towards the base, sessile, 100–300 mm (3.9–11.8 in) long and 50–150 mm (2.0–5.9 in) wide. The flowers are bisexual and are borne in panicles 35–100 mm (1.4–3.9 in) long, in leaf axils. The sepals are more or less round, 1.5–2 mm (0.059–0.079 in) long and joined at the base. The petals are pink, rarely white, about 4.5 mm (0.18 in) and are hairy with a ridge on the back. There are four stamens. Flowering occurs from March to June and the fruit consists of up to four follicles 4–6 mm (0.16–0.24 in) long.

== Taxonomy ==
This species was first formally described in 1865 by Ferdinand von Mueller who gave it the name Euodia bonwickii and published the description in Fragmenta phytographiae Australiae from specimens collected by John Dallachy. In 1994, Thomas Gordon Hartley changed the name to Melicope bonwickii in the journal Sandakania. The specific epithet (bonwickii) honours James Bonwick.

== Distribution and habitat ==
Melicope bonwickii occurs naturally in Java and the Philippines, and southward to New Guinea and north-eastern Australia. It grows in rainforest from sea level to an altitude of 900 m (3,000 ft). In Australia it is found from the Atherton Tableland to near Proserpine in northern Queensland.

== Uses ==
This species is said to be used to treat dysentery in the Tanimbar Islands. It is harvested for its timber.
