= Hofwyl School =

Progressive 19th century Swiss school

Coordinates: 47.021°N 7.462°E

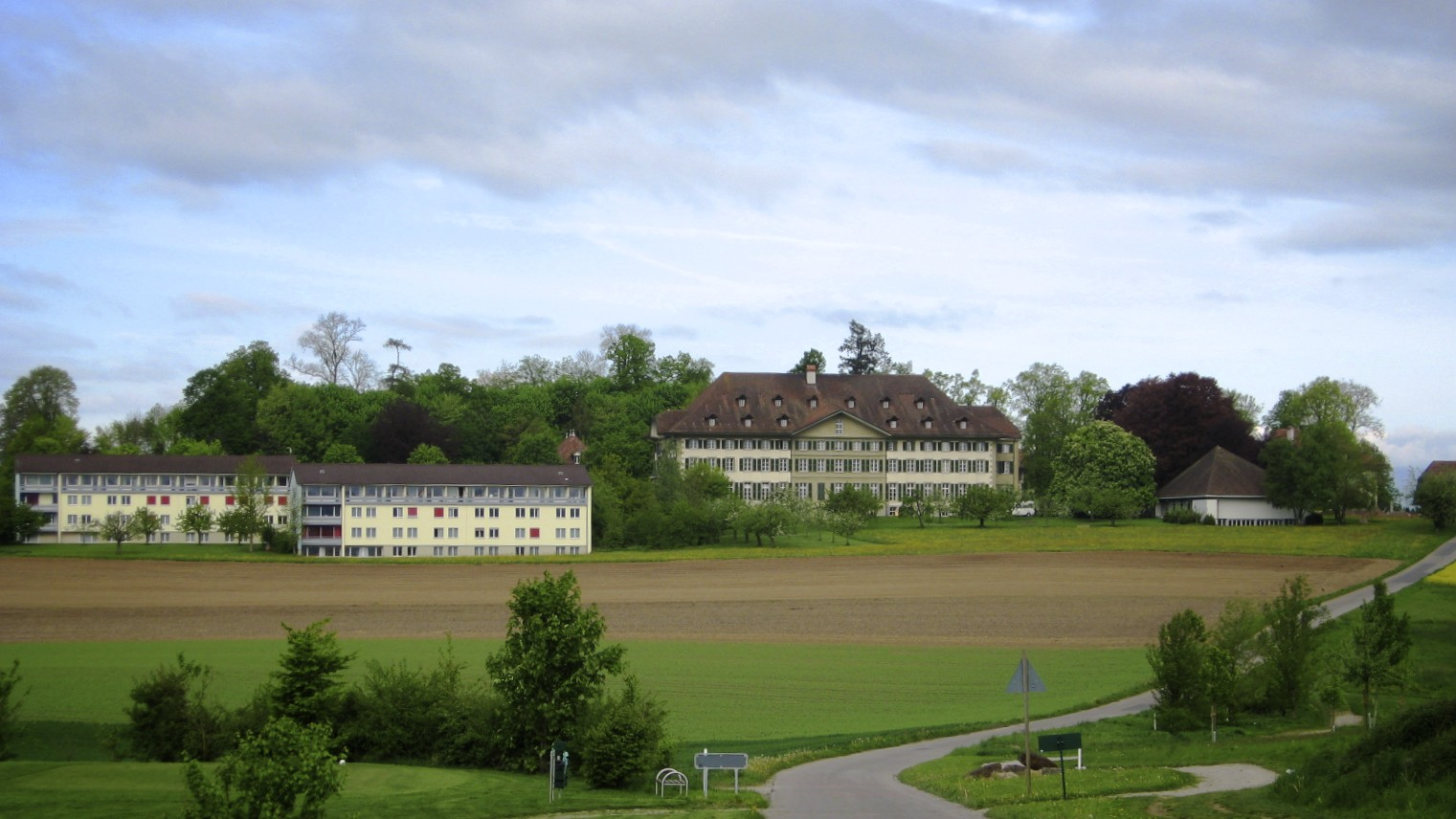
Hofwyl school, Münchenbuchsee, Switzerland, with boarding school on the left and assembly hall on the right

Hofwyl School was a progressive, Swiss boarding school and teaching college in the village of Hofwil, founded by Philipp Emanuel von Fellenberg at the start of the 19th century.

== History ==
Fellenberg took over the estate of Hofwyl in 1799 from his father and transformed it into several schools to educate all levels of society. He established a school for the poor, a secondary school for local students and an institute for the sons of wealthy families throughout Europe. The Hofwil Institution building was constructed between 1817 and 1821 as a centerpiece of Emanuel von Fellenberg's educational vision. The outbuildings were completed in 1818, followed by a teacher's house in 1819 and another school building around 1820.

== Pedagogy ==
The school, which Fellenberg ran for 45 years, was the first agricultural school. The sons of farmers and others would live at the boarding school, and their work in the fields would sustain the school, so most of them did not have to pay tuition, ensuring the school remained financially stable. It was well known in the 19th century for its innovative pedagogy. A 1857 article in The Massachusetts Teacher and Journal of Home and School Education wrote that the system "proved that pupils, who enter such an institution at ten years of age, and remain there ten years, can, by their labor alone, defray their expenses for board, clothing, and instruction, besides having learned a useful occupation". The combination of academic and agricultural training also included the development of innovative techniques in agriculture, such as the use of sowing and reaping machines, the introduction of new seeds and plants, and the improvement of existing species.

The pedagogy was radical for the time in that it did not allow corporal punishment or rewards and incentives.

== Influence ==
Hofwyl inspired many schools around the world. Often, these schools were established to train children from poor families to be productive members of society. In the United Kingdom, Lady Byron established Ealing Grove School, which was directly inspired by Hofwyl School. She also published a pamphlet titled The History of Industrial Schools (republished as an appendix in Ethel Mayne's biography of Lady Byron) and was probably the author of the book What De Fellenberg has Done for Education, published anonymously in 1839. In Australia, in the 1840s, James Bonwick named his boarding school Hofwyl House and was called "the de Fellenberg of Tasmania."

== After Fellenberg's death ==
After Fellenberg's death in 1844, the schools struggled, and eventually, each one closed. The Canton of Bern bought the building in 1884 to house the expansion of the teachers' college, which had been founded in 1833 in Münchenbuchsee. Over the following decades, it became just a preparatory school that fed into the main teacher's college in Bern. However, in 1973, it once again became a full college. In 1997, it changed again, this time into a music institute for students in grades 10 through 12. The building also houses an optional boarding school for students.
