= Hofwil =

Village in the canton of Bern, Switzerland

Coordinates: 47°01′13″N 7°27′45″E

Hofwil is a village in the canton of Bern, Switzerland, part of the municipality of Münchenbuchsee.

The village of Hofwil was originally part of the lands owned by the Münchenbuchsee Commandery, a medieval commandery of the Knights Hospitaller in nearby Münchenbuchsee. After the commandery was suppressed during the Protestant Reformation, Hofwil was owned by a number of nobles. In 1719 Hieronymus von Erlach combined the village with Moosseedorf.

Hofwil Castle was built in 1784-86 by the architect Carl Ahasver von Sinner for Gabriel Albrecht von Erlach. A peristyle was added to the neo-classical building in 1798.

The Hofwil Institution was built by Philipp Emanuel von Fellenberg, a Bernese patrician. He took over the estate of Hofwyl in 1799 from his father and transformed it into several schools to educate all levels of society. He established a school for the poor, a secondary school for local students and an institute for the sons of wealthy families throughout Europe. The institute, which was founded in 1808, gradually became the largest school and developed an international reputation. The Hofwil Institution building was built in 1817-21 as a center piece of Emanuel von Fellenberg's educational vision. The outbuildings were built in 1818, followed by a teacher's house in 1819 and another school building around 1820. After Fellenberg's death in 1844 the schools struggled and eventually every one closed. The Canton of Bern bought the building in 1884 to house the expansion of the teachers' college, which had been founded in 1833 in Münchenbuchsee. Over the following decades it became just a preparatory school which fed into the main teacher's college in Bern. However, in 1973 it once again became a full college. In 1997 it changed again, this time into a music institute for the 10th through 12th grade. The building also houses an optional boarding school for students.

The swimming pool at Hofwil, the Hofwil Institution and Hofwil Castle are listed as Swiss heritage site of national significance. The entire area around Hofwil is part of the Inventory of Swiss Heritage Sites.

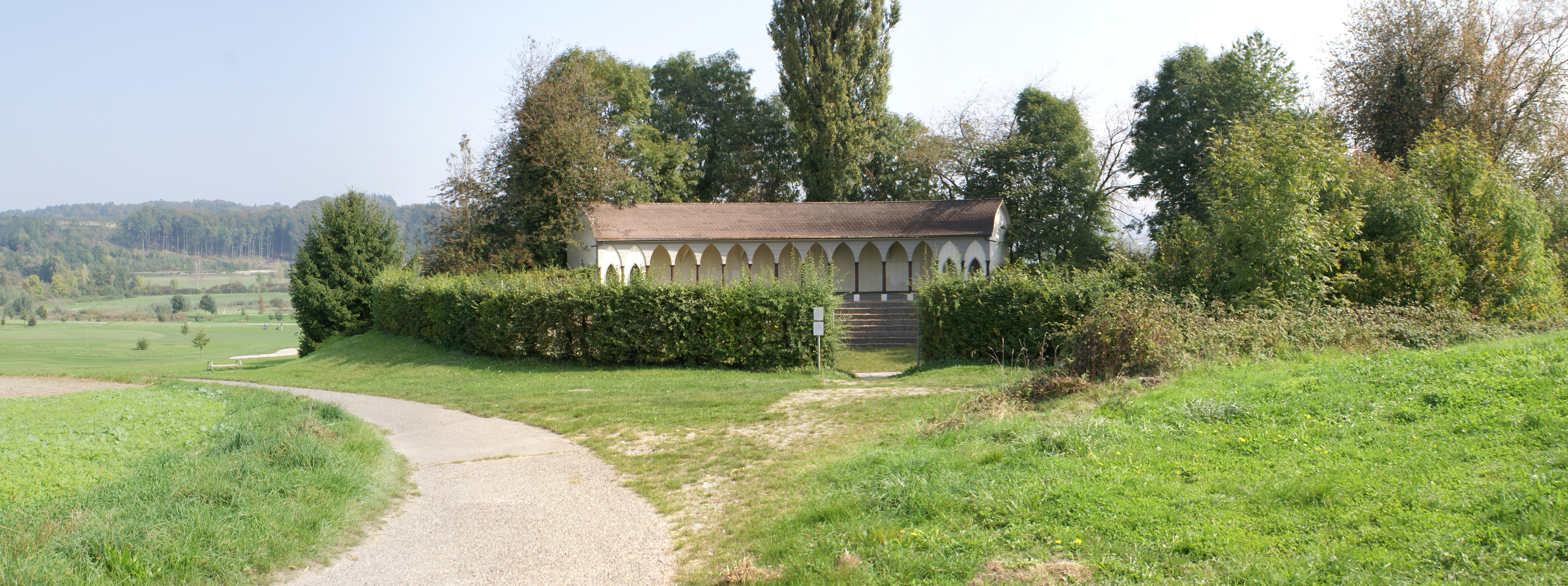
Hofwil Swimming Facility

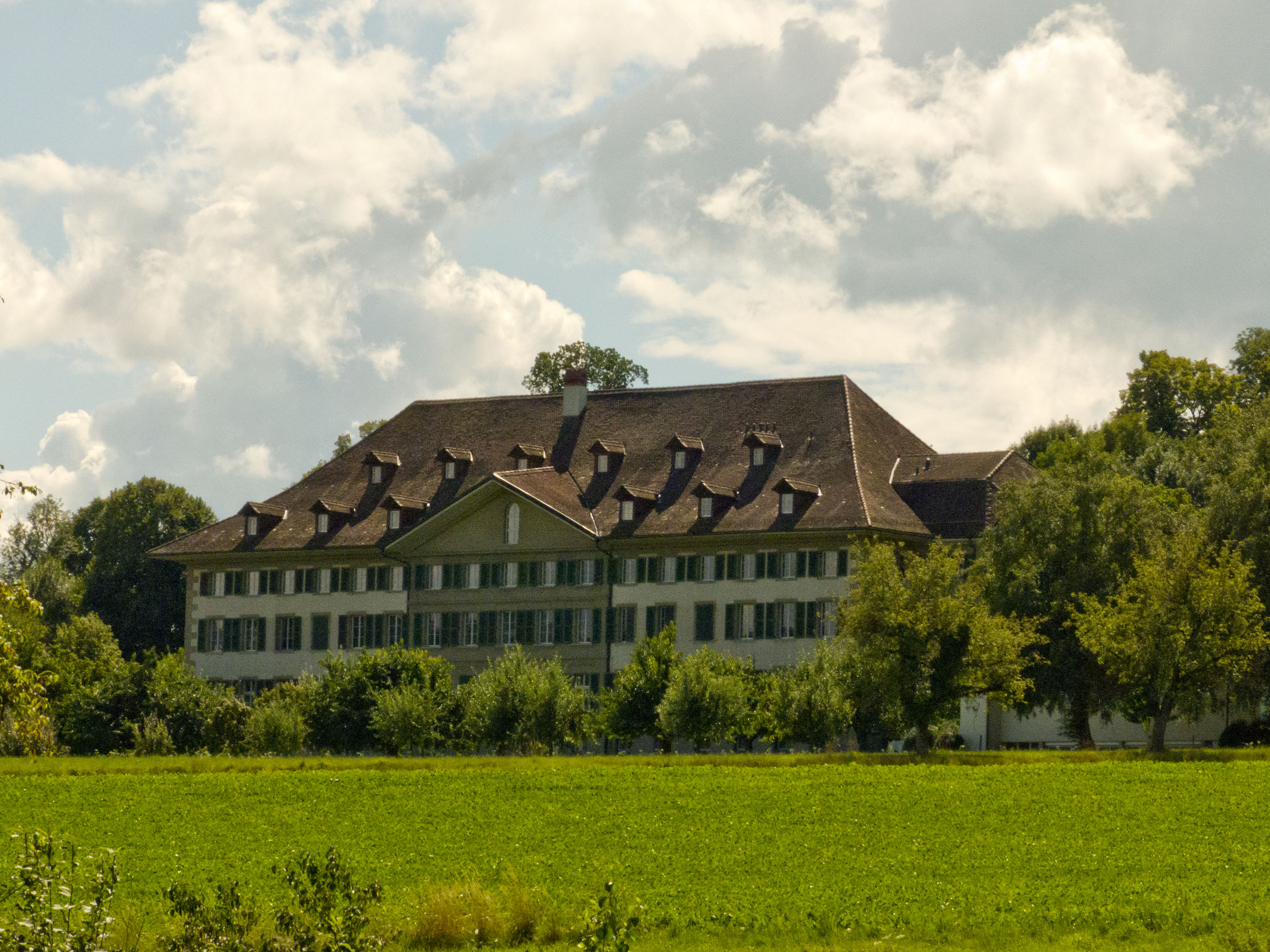
Hofwil Institution

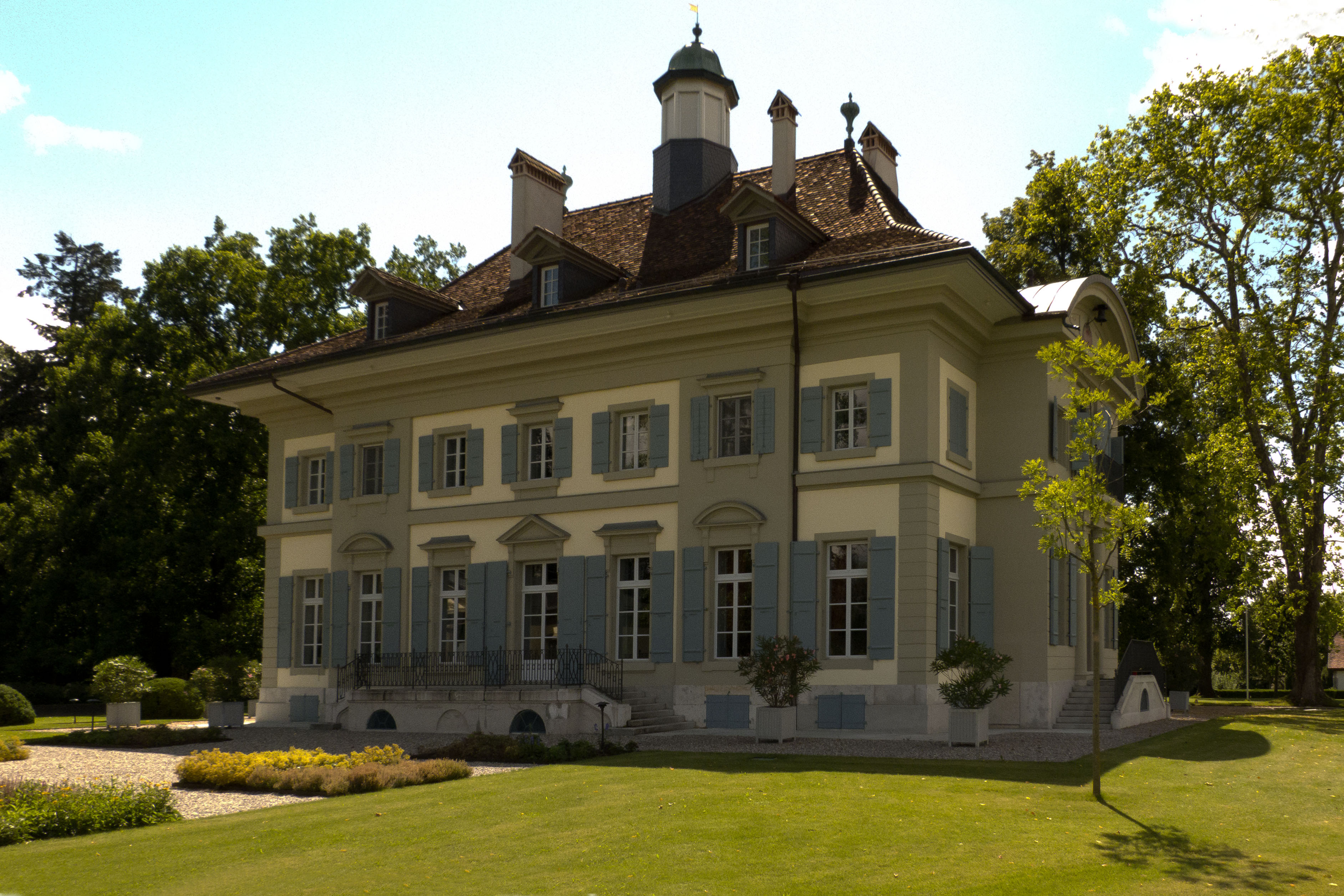
Hofwil Castle
