= Hofwil Castle =

Castle in Münchenbuchsee, Switzerland

- Schloss Hofwil
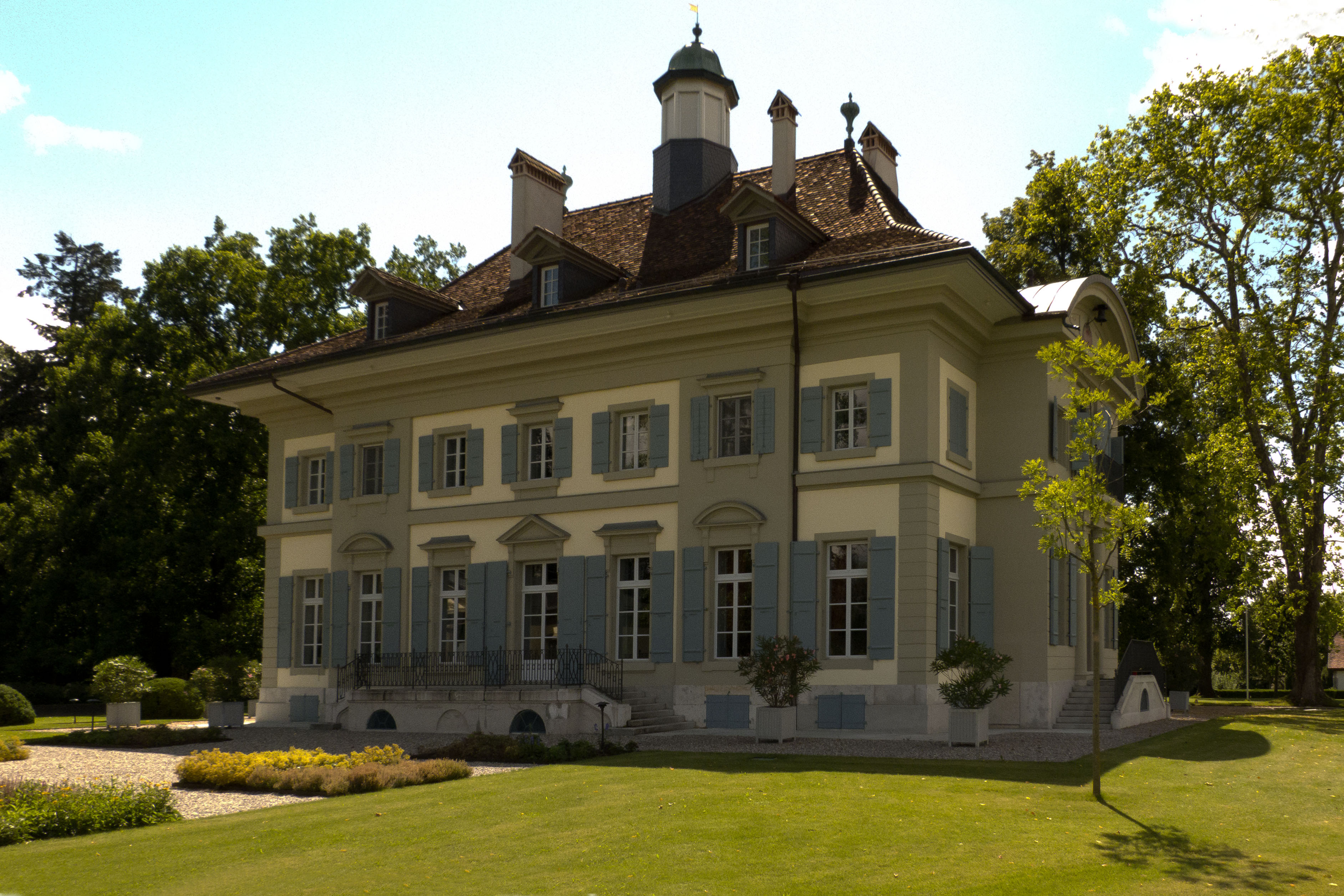

- Location within Switzerland

General information
- Location: Münchenbuchsee
- Coordinates: 47.021293°N 7.461731°E
- Completed: 1786

Hofwil Castle is a castle in the municipality of Münchenbuchsee of the Canton of Bern in Switzerland. It is a Swiss heritage site of national significance.

== History ==
The castle was built in 1784–86 by the architect Carl Ahasver von Sinner for Gabriel Albrecht von Erlach. A peristyle was added to the neo-classical building in 1798.

== Castle grounds ==
The land around the castle was laid out as an English garden with a pavilion which holds the tomb of Emanuel von Fellenberg. The park is decorated with a number of statues including a bronze youth by Max Fueter from 1949 and the Pestalozzi monument by Alfred Lanz from 1888. The workshops and barn were built in 1885.

== See also ==
- List of castles in Switzerland
