= Ealing Grove School =

Co-operative school founded in 1834

Ealing Grove School was a school located in the West London district of Ealing. It was founded in by Annabella Noel Byron in 1834 as England's first co-operative school, following Philipp Emanuel von Fellenberg's progressive pedagogy. Students combined academic subjects with three hours of gardening each day, and corporal punishment was not allowed. The school was renamed Byron House School in 1857, and Ealing Grammar School in 1896. It was shut down in 1917.

== Establishment by Lady Byron ==
Ealing Grove school was founded in 1834 by Annabella Noel Byron, also known as Lady Byron, Baroness of Wentworth. The first headmaster was E.T. Craig, who only stayed until 1835.

== Pedagogy ==
The pedagogical philosophy of the school drew heavily upon that of the Swiss pedagogues Johann Heinrich Pestalozzi and Philipp Emanuel von Fellenberg, and the British socialist Robert Owen. The basic idea was that character is founded during early childhood, and that punishments and rewards were counter-productive: "Fear makes slaves, and "love of distinction" leads to the bullying and the aggressive passions encouraged in England's elite public school systems".

Students at the school were given instruction in reading, writing, mathematics, geography, and natural history, with optional instruction in mechanics, drawing or carpentry as well. In addition, students were given allotments and time to garden every day, growing vegetables that they could sell to the school or give to their parents. Students were also taught how to keep records of their expenses and income in order to be able to run their own businesses as adults.

Lady Byron visited Fellenberg's Hofwyl School in 1828, and sent two young cousins there as students. She published a pamphlet titled The History of Industrial Schools (republished as an appendix in Ethel Mayne's biography of Lady Byron) and was probably the author of the book What De Fellenberg has Done for Education, published anonymously in 1839.

== Byron House School ==
Charles N. Atlee renamed the school Byron House School in 1859. In 1861 there were 87 boys in attendance aged between 8 and 17.

== Ealing Grammar School ==
The school was again renamed in 1896, this time to Ealing Grammar School. In 1912 the school had 200 boarders, but it was shut down in 1917.
