= Cooperative school =

Co-operative schools are characterised by the co-operative values and principles which underpin the practice of all co-operative organisations. In England and Wales, around 850 schools currently use co-operative values to support the curriculum design, pedagogy and structures for accountability and democracy.

== History ==
Co-operative schools have a long history in Britain, and can be seen as part of the British co-operative movement growing out of the Owenism sparked by Robert Owen's work from the 1820s to combat poverty by creating worker co-operatives.

Another inspiration came from progressive Swiss pedagogy, like that of Philipp Emanuel von Fellenberg's at Hofwyl School. The first co-operative school may have been Ealing Grove School, which was founded in 1834 by Lady Byron.

== Current organisation in the United Kingdom ==
Two main forms exist in the state education system: co-operative trust or foundation schools and co-operative academies.

=== Foundation schools: Co-operative trusts ===
Co-operative trusts were made possible under the 2006 Education and Inspections Act, introduced by the then Secretary of State for Education, Ed Balls MP. The 2006 Act provided two main aspects of legislation, which could be characterised as 'carrot and stick' in their purpose. The latter embraced a series of powers for local authorities and the Secretary of State to intervene in underperforming schools, classified at the time as those with the lowest grades of Ofsted Inspection outcomes. These powers are set to be extended considerably through the introduction of the 2015 Education and Adoption Act.

Using these powers, a pioneer model of a foundation trust based on co-operative values was used for the first time in 2007 by Reddish Vale High School, Stockport. Within a year, a further 25 schools adopted the model as one offering strong values and extensive engagement of all stakeholders within the learning community. The growth of the sector or movement has embraced all phases and has seen particular interest from schools offering special educational provision.

=== Co-operative academies ===
The UK's Coalition government, elected in 2010, rapidly passed new legislation in the form of the Academies Act 2010 to enable a considerable growth in 'independent state sector' schools in England - namely academies. These operate under a direct contractual arrangement and funding agreement with the Department for Education in England - with the local authority relinquishing powers of supervision or intervention. Furthermore, provisions were enacted which meant that all newly established schools would from this point forward be independent of the local authority.

In response, the co-operative education movement worked with the DfE to formulate a variant of the standard Academy Articles, the legal constitution, to embrace key elements of co-operative values and principles.

== National and regional networks ==
As the numbers of co-operative schools and partnerships increased, the need for a national body to provide a voice for the movement was increasingly clear. In 2009, the Schools Co-operative Society was established to fulfil that function, with a membership system and representatives on a national board reflecting the regions. An example of cross-region collaboration can be found in the links forged between LASER and the Eastern Region in 2015, using the vehicle of the Co-operative Schools Network (CSNET) to share communications, administration and intellectual property freely and co-operatively with each other.

== See also ==
- Cooperative education
