= Philipp Emanuel von Fellenberg =

Swiss educationalist and agronomist

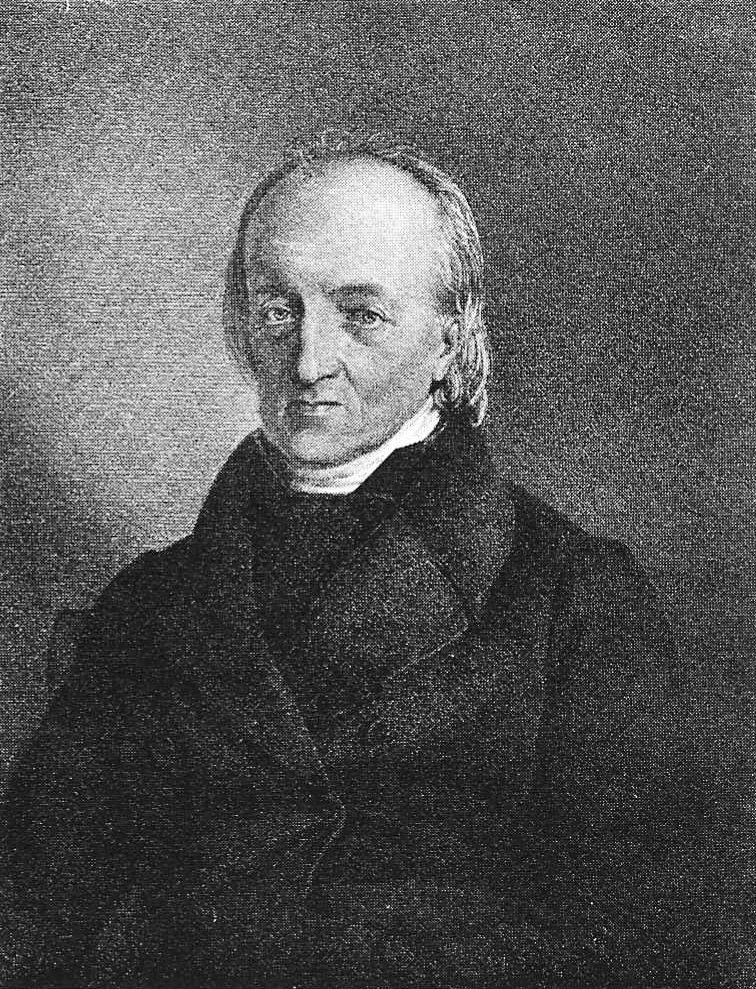
- Born: 27 June 1771; Bern, Switzerland
- Died: 21 November 1844 (aged 73)
- Citizenship: Switzerland
- Education: University of Tübingen
- Occupations: Educationalist and agronomist
- Years active: 1799–1844

Philipp Emanuel von Fellenberg (27 June 1771 – 21 November 1844) was a Swiss educationalist and agronomist.

== Biography ==
He was born at Bern. His father was of patrician family, and a man of importance in his canton, and his mother was a granddaughter of the Dutch admiral Van Tromp. From his mother and from Gottlieb Konrad Pfeffel, the blind poet of Colmar, he received a better education than falls to the lot of most boys, while the intimacy of his father with Pestalozzi gave to his mind that bent which it afterwards followed. In 1790 he entered the University of Tübingen, where he distinguished himself by his rapid progress in legal studies.

On account of his health he afterwards undertook a walking tour in Switzerland and the adjoining portions of France, Swabia and Tirol, visiting the hamlets and farmhouses, mingling in the labors and occupations of the peasants and mechanics, and partaking of their rude fare and lodging. After the downfall of Robespierre, he went to Paris and remained there long enough to be assured of the storm impending over his native country. This he did his best to avert, but his warnings were disregarded, and Switzerland was lost before any efficient means could be taken for its safety. Fellenberg, who had hastily raised a levy en masse, was proscribed; a price was set upon his head, and he was compelled to flee into Germany.

Shortly afterwards, however, he was recalled by his countrymen, and sent on a mission to Paris to remonstrate against the rapacity and cruelty of the agents of the French republic. But in this and other diplomatic offices which he held for a short time, he was witness to so much corruption and intrigue that his mind revolted from the idea of a political life, and he returned home with the intention of devoting himself wholly to the education of the young.

== Educational reform ==
In 1799 Fellenberg purchased the estate of Hofwyl, near Bern. He established a cooperative school at Hofwyl where students combined manual labour with studies of literature and science inspired by educationalist Johann Heinrich Pestalozzi. The school, which Fellenberg ran for 45 years, was the first agricultural school. The sons of farmers and others would live at the boarding school, and their work on the fields would sustain the school so most of them did not have to pay tuition, but the school financially stable. The school was well-known in the 19th century for its innovative pedagogy. A 1857 article in The Massachusetts Teacher and Journal of Home and School Education wrote that the system "proved that pupils, who enter such an institution at ten years of age, and remain there ten years, can, by their labor alone, defray their expenses for board, clothing, and instruction, besides having learned a useful occupation". The school also accepted students from wealthy families who would pay tuition. The combination of academic and agricultural training also included the development of innovative techniques in agriculture, such as the use of sowing and reaping machines, the introduction of new seeds and plants, and the improvement of existing species.

The pedagogy was radical for the time in that it did not allow corporal punishment or rewards and incentives.

Hofwyl inspired many schools around the world. Often these schools were established to train children from poor families to be productive members of society. In the United Kingdom, Lady Byron established Ealing Grove School that was directly inspired by Hofwyl School. She also published a book on the published a pamphlet titled The History of Industrial Schools (republished as an appendix in Ethel Mayne's biography of Lady Byron) and was probably the author of the book What De Fellenberg has Done for Education, published anonymously in 1839. In Australia in the 1840s, James Bonwick named his boarding school Hofwyl House, and was called "the de Fellenberg of Tasmania".

For forty-five years Fellenberg, assisted by his wife, who ran the side of the school devoted to girls, continued his educational labors, and finally raised his institution to the highest point of prosperity and usefulness. He died in 1844. The school at Hofwyl was closed only four years after his death.

== Works ==
- 1808: Landwirthschaftliche Blätter von Hofwyl. 5 Hefte. Aarau: Maurhofer & Dellenbach, 1808-1817
  - 1813: Darstellung der Armen-rziehungsanstalt in Hofwyl. Von ihrem Stifter E. v. F. Aus dem vierten Hefte der landwirthschaftlichen Blätter von Hofwyl besonders abgedruckt. Aarau
  - 1813: Observations extraites des feuilles d'Hofwyl, sur les semoirs à grains de toute espèce et leur emploi. [Bern?]
- 1808: Vues relatives à l'agriculture de la Suisse et aux moyens de la perfectionner; traduit de l'Allemand par C. Pictet. Genève
- 1811: Vorläufige Nachricht über die Erziehungsanstalt für die höheren Stände zu Hofwyl. [Berne]
- 1830: Beleuchtung einer weltgerichtlichen Frage an unsern Zeitgeist. Bern: bei C. A. Jenni (Reissued by Thoemmes Press, Bristol, 1994 ISBN 1-85506-279-8)
- 1831: Sendschreiben an den Verfassungsrath des Kantons Bern, ... April 1831. Bern: Gedruckt bei Carl Rätzer
- 1833: Der dreimonatliche Bildungskurs, Bern

== Note on sources ==
Parts of this article were taken from Chisholm, Hugh, ed. (1911). "Fellenberg, Philipp Emanuel von" . Encyclopædia Britannica (11th ed.). Cambridge University Press. This work in turn cites:

- Hamm, Wilhelm von. Fellenberg's Leben und Wirken: zur Erinnerung für seine Freunde, Schüler und Verehrer (Bern, 1845)
- Schöni, Franz Robert. Der Stifter von Hofwyl, Leben und Wirken Fellenberg's (Bern, 1871 & Schaffhausen, 1874)

== See also ==
- Theodor Müller
