= James Bonwick =

Australian writer

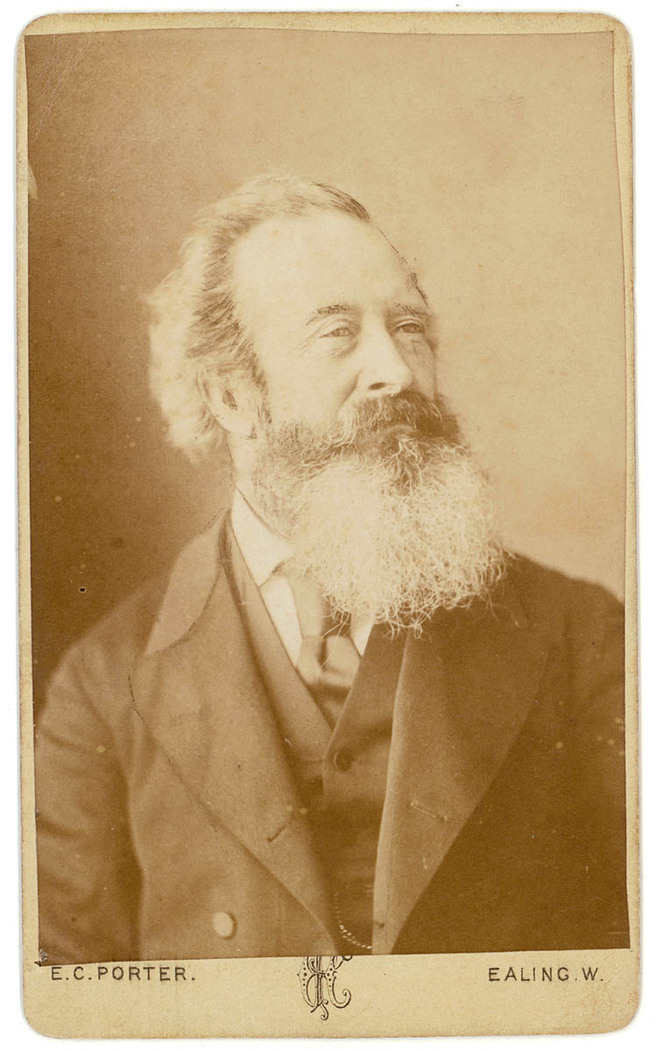
- James Bonwick, by Edward Cecil Porter, 1885-1890
- Born: 6 July 1817; Lingfield, Surrey, England
- Died: 6 February 1906 (aged 88); Southwick, Sussex, England
- Occupations: teacher, author, historian and archivist
- Known for: Bonwick Transcripts
- Spouse: Esther Anne Beddow (m. 1840)
- Children: 7 children (2 dying in infancy)
- Parent(s): James Bonwick and Mary Preston

James Bonwick (8 July 1817 – 6 February 1906) was an English-born Australian historical and educational writer.

== Career in Australia ==
=== Author ===
Bonwick's initial works drew on his experience as a teacher and later of the Victorian gold diggings. He extended his repertoire, focusing on the history of Colonial Australia and religious subjects. Some of Bonwick's more important volumes were John Batman (1867); The Last of the Tasmanians (1870), Daily Life and Origin of the Tasmanians, and Curious Facts of Old Colonial Days, all of which were published in 1870; Egyptian Belief and Modern Thought (1878), First Twenty Years of Australia (1882), Port Phillip Settlement (1883), Romance of the Wool Trade (1887) and Irish Druids and Old Irish Religions (1894).

=== Archivist ===
James Bonwick began examining historical records of Australian interest in London in 1884 and in 1887 he was authorised by the New South Wales Colonial Secretary, Sir Henry Parkes to transcribe Governors’ despatches from the Public Record Office as part of a drive to collect records for an official centenary history of New South Wales.

Bonwick was appointed archivist for the New South Wales government in 1888 and continued until 1902. He compiled what became known as the Bonwick Transcripts. These handwritten transcripts of records held in the Public Record Office, London (now The National Archives) were published in the series Historical Records of New South Wales (1892-1901).

== Legacy ==
Bonwick is best remembered for his transcripts of British Government records that formed the basis of the reference work: Historical Records of New South Wales.

It is true that Bonwick's transcripts and the resulting 7 volumes of Historical Records of New South Wales received later criticism. His selections were arbitrary and he was accused of censorship and excluding material that reflected poorly on individuals whether government officials, the military and free settlers, or drew attention to convict origins.

However, these transcripts and publications had great utilitarian value for researchers, students and general readers who had no chance of seeing the original documents in Britain. Eventually the National Library of Australia and the State Library of New South Wales were to approach the Public Record Office with requests to microfilm these records comprehensively. This ultimately led to the two libraries signing an agreement with the PRO to establish the Australian Joint Copying Project (AJCP).

The Bonwick Transcripts were transferred to the Mitchell Library when it was founded in 1910 as the "Australiana" Wing of the Library.

In 1856, the Victorian government botanist Ferdinand von Mueller, named Euodia bonwickii (now Melicope bonwickii) in his honour.

== See also ==
- Australian Joint Copying Project
