= Zuzwil =

Zuzwil may refer to:

- Zuzwil, Bern
- Zuzwil, St. Gallen
