= Iffwil =

Swiss municipality in the canton of Bern

- Municipality
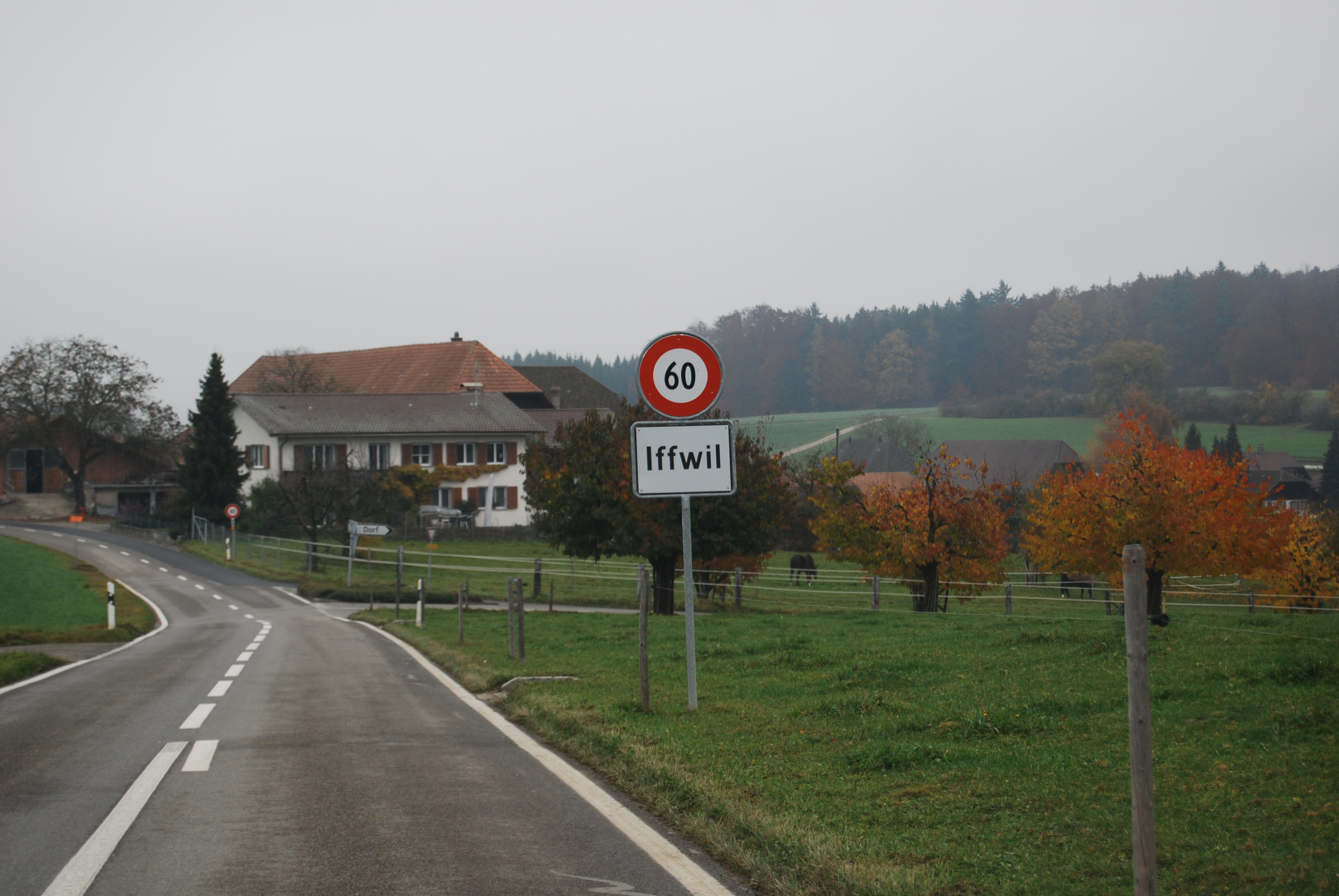
- Iffwil village entrance

- Flag Coat of arms
- Location of Iffwil
- Location within Switzerland Location within Canton of Bern
- Coordinates: 47°4′N 7°29′E
- Country: Switzerland
- Canton: Bern
- District: Bern-Mittelland

Government
  - Executive: Gemeinderat with 5 members
  - Mayor: Gemeindepräsident; Marc Junker (as of 2026)

Area
  - Total: 5.0 km^{2} (1.9 sq mi)
- Elevation: 580 m (1,900 ft)

Population (December 2020)
  - Total: 5,738
  - Density: 1,100/km^{2} (3,000/sq mi)
- Time zone: UTC+01:00 (CET)
  - Summer (DST): UTC+02:00 (CEST)
- Postal code: 3303
- SFOS number: 541
- ISO 3166 code: CH-BE
- Surrounded by: Bangerten, Etzelkofen, Grafenried, Jegenstorf, Scheunen, Zuzwil
- Website: https://iffwil.ch/

Iffwil is a municipality in the Bern-Mittelland administrative district in the canton of Bern in Switzerland.

== History ==
Iffwil is first mentioned in 1148 as Iffenwilere.

Scattered neolithic items were found around the municipality and a Hallstatt grave mound was discovered in the Iffwilerwald.

A castle was mentioned near the village in 1346, though only the foundations remain. During the Middle Ages, a number of landowners owned part or all of the village, including the Counts of Kyburg and the Lords of Jegistorf and Seedorf. In 1332 the Lords of Seedorf sold land and the village low court to citizens of Bern. Between 1334 and 1361 most of these citizens sold or donated their holdings in the village to the Niedere Spital (Lower Hospital) in Bern. The Hospital appointed an administrator to manage the estates in Iffwil. The village of dorf ze Ober Iffwil (Upper Iffwil village) was last mentioned in 1356. Sometime after that date, the village was abandoned.

During the 20th century, the municipality has changed from a rural, agricultural village into a commuter town. The location near Bern and at the intersection of the Jegenstorf-Scheunen and Münchenbuchsee-Mülchi roads have encouraged commuters to settle in the municipality. The new neighborhoods of Bergacker and Dorf were built starting in 1965 to house the growing population. Currently, about two-thirds of the population commutes to jobs in nearby cities.

== Geography ==
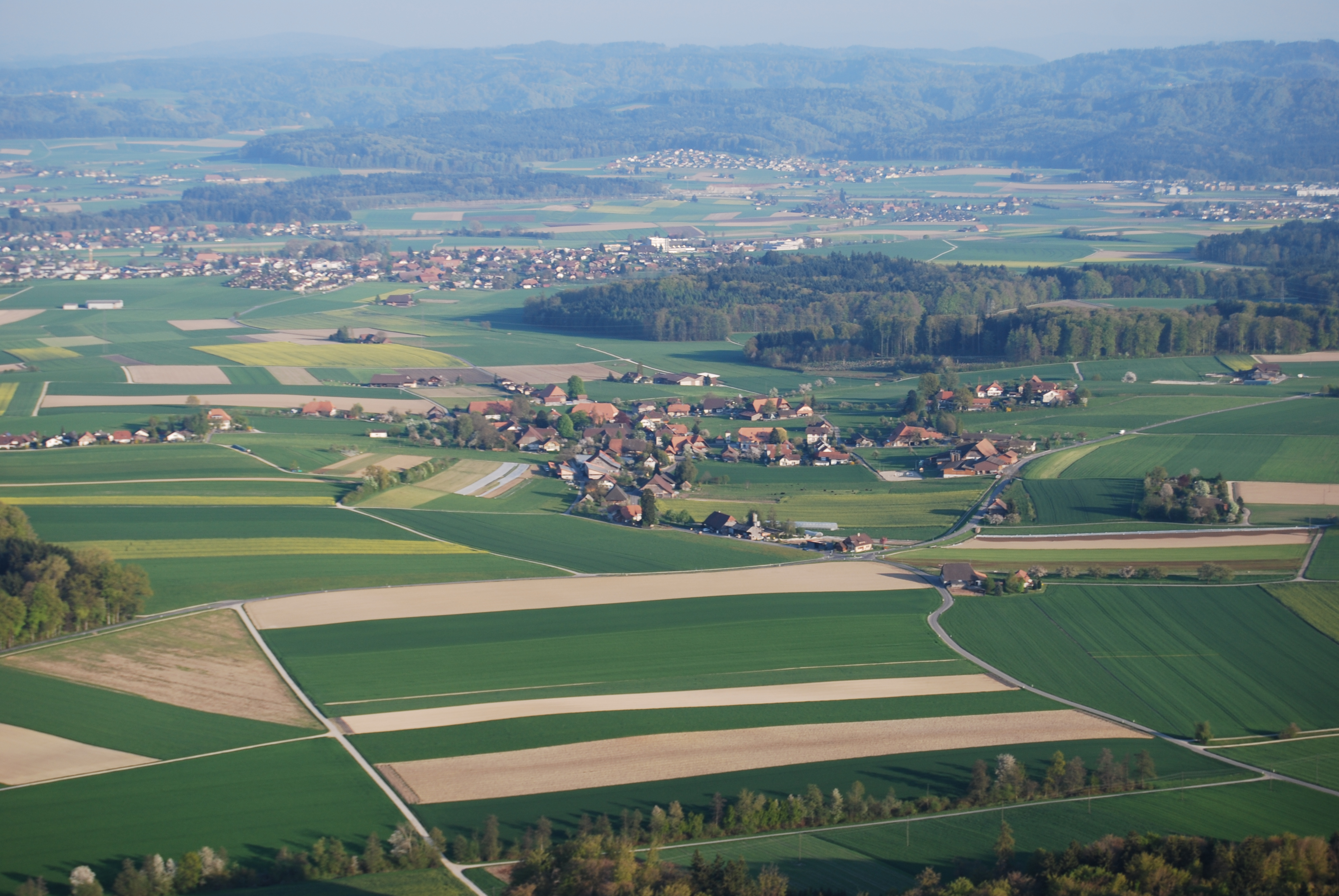
Aerial view of Iffwil

Aerial view by Walter Mittelholzer (1931)

Iffwil has an area of 5.06 km^{2} (1.95 sq mi). Of this area, 2.79 km^{2} (1.08 mi^{2}) or 55.1% is used for agricultural purposes, while 1.84 km^{2} (0.71 mi^{2}) or 36.4% is forested. Of the rest of the land, 0.4 km^{2} (0.15 mi^{2}) or 7.9% is settled (buildings or roads).

Of the built up area, housing and buildings made up 2.6% and transportation infrastructure made up 5.1%. Out of the forested land, all of the forested land area is covered with heavy forests. Of the agricultural land, 46.8% is used for growing crops and 6.7% is pastures, while 1.6% is used for orchards or vine crops.

The municipality is located on the Rapperswil plateau.

On 31 December 2009 Amtsbezirk Fraubrunnen, the municipality's former district, was dissolved. On the following day, 1 January 2010, it joined the newly created Verwaltungskreis Bern-Mittelland.

== Coat of arms ==
The blazon of the municipal coat of arms is Per fess embatteled of one Argent and Sable and in chief a Bear Paw couped of the last.

== Demographics ==
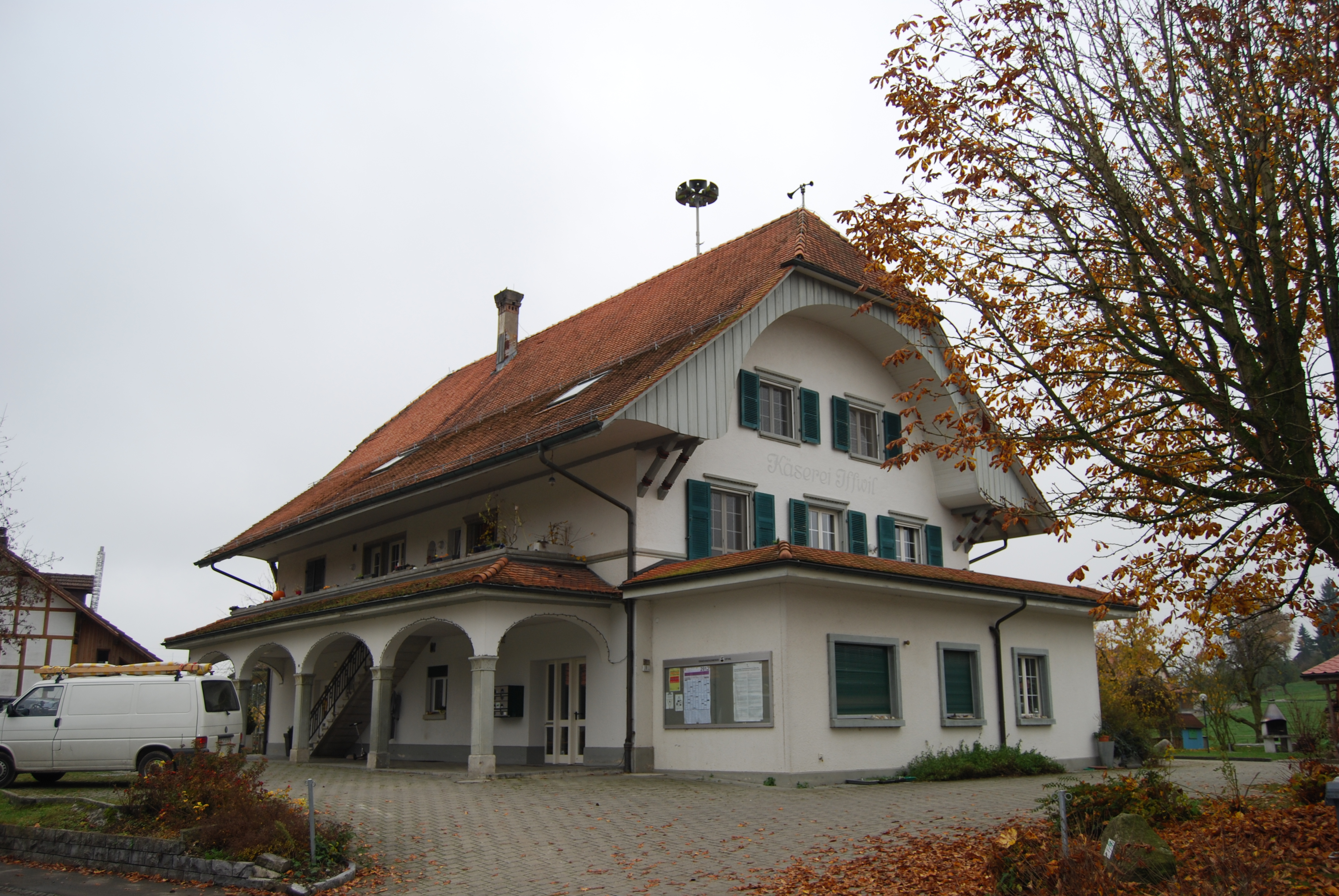
Town hall of Iffwil

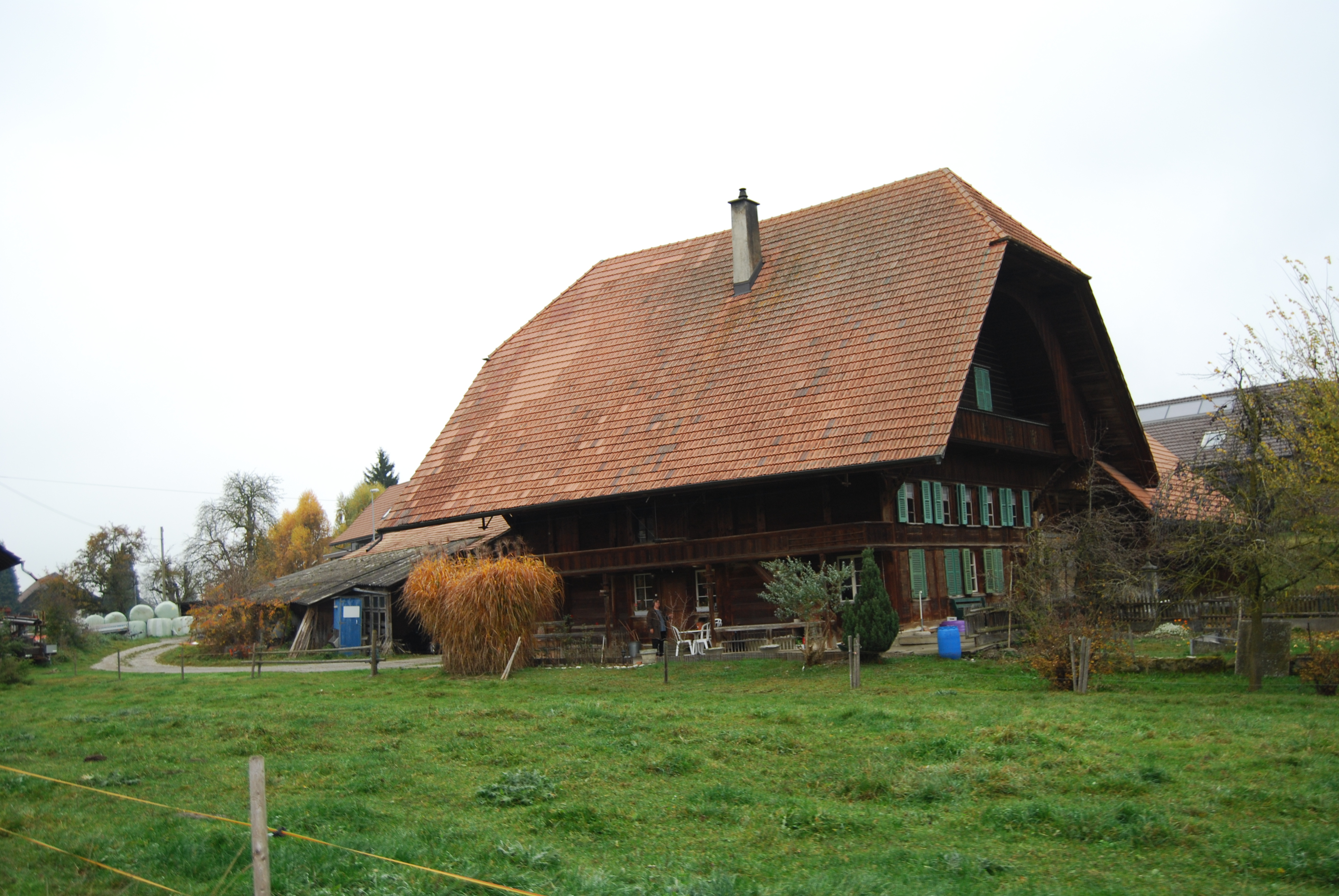
Farm house in the municipality

Iffwil has a population (as of December 2020) of 428. As of 2010, 1.9% of the population are resident foreign nationals. Over the last 10 years (2000–2010) the population has changed at a rate of −2.1%. Migration accounted for 3.1%, while births and deaths accounted for 4.7%.

Most of the population (as of 2000) speaks German (405 or 98.1%) as their first language, French is the second most common (2 or 0.5%) and Spanish is the third (1 or 0.2%).

As of 2008, the population was 50.6% male and 49.4% female. The population was made up of 206 Swiss men (50.1% of the population) and 2 (0.5%) non-Swiss men. There were 197 Swiss women (47.9%) and 6 (1.5%) non-Swiss women. Of the population in the municipality, 120 or about 29.1% were born in Iffwil and lived there in 2000. There were 202 or 48.9% who were born in the same canton, while 61 or 14.8% were born somewhere else in Switzerland, and 13 or 3.1% were born outside of Switzerland.

As of 2010, children and teenagers (0–19 years old) make up 21.4% of the population, while adults (20–64 years old) make up 64% and seniors (over 64 years old) make up 14.6%.

As of 2000, there were 165 people who were single and never married in the municipality. There were 213 married individuals, 19 widows or widowers and 16 individuals who are divorced.

As of 2000, there were 28 households that consist of only one person and 12 households with five or more people. In 2000, a total of 150 apartments (89.3% of the total) were permanently occupied, while 12 apartments (7.1%) were seasonally occupied and 6 apartments (3.6%) were empty. The vacancy rate for the municipality, in 2011, was 0.57%.

The historical population is given in the following chart:

== Politics ==
In the 2011 federal election the most popular party was the Swiss People's Party (SVP) which received 33.5% of the vote. The next three most popular parties were the Conservative Democratic Party (BDP) (29.7%), the Social Democratic Party (SP) (7.7%) and the Green Party (7.6%). In the federal election, a total of 224 votes were cast, and the voter turnout was 68.3%.

== Economy ==
As of 2011, Iffwil had an unemployment rate of 0.44%. As of 2008, there were a total of 122 people employed in the municipality. Of these, there were 49 people employed in the primary economic sector and about 15 businesses involved in this sector. 3 people were employed in the secondary sector and there were 3 businesses in this sector. 70 people were employed in the tertiary sector, with 16 businesses in this sector. There were 244 residents of the municipality who were employed in some capacity, of which females made up 43.9% of the workforce.

In 2008 there were a total of 89 full-time equivalent jobs. The number of jobs in the primary sector was 35, all of which were in agriculture. The number of jobs in the secondary sector was 3 of which 1 was in manufacturing and 2 (66.7%) were in construction. The number of jobs in the tertiary sector was 51. In the tertiary sector; 13 or 25.5% were in wholesale or retail sales or the repair of motor vehicles, 2 or 3.9% were the insurance or financial industry, 8 or 15.7% were technical professionals or scientists, 4 or 7.8% were in education and 18 or 35.3% were in health care.

In 2000, there were 29 workers who commuted into the municipality and 170 workers who commuted away. The municipality is a net exporter of workers, with about 5.9 workers leaving the municipality for every one entering. Of the working population, 16.4% used public transportation to get to work, and 51.6% used a private car.

== Religion ==
From the 2000 census, 31 or 7.5% were Roman Catholic, while 313 or 75.8% belonged to the Swiss Reformed Church. Of the rest of the population, there were 30 individuals (or about 7.26% of the population) who belonged to another Christian church. There was 1 person who was Hindu. 40 (or about 9.69% of the population) belonged to no church, are agnostic or atheist, and 13 individuals (or about 3.15% of the population) did not answer the question.

== Education ==
In Iffwil about 173 or (41.9%) of the population have completed non-mandatory upper secondary education, and 66 or (16.0%) have completed additional higher education (either university or a Fachhochschule). Of the 66 who completed tertiary schooling, 74.2% were Swiss men, 22.7% were Swiss women.

The Canton of Bern school system provides one year of non-obligatory Kindergarten, followed by six years of Primary school. This is followed by three years of obligatory lower Secondary school where the students are separated according to ability and aptitude. Following the lower Secondary students may attend additional schooling or they may enter an apprenticeship.

During the 2010–11 school year, there were a total of 42 students attending classes in Iffwil. There were no kindergarten classes in the municipality. The municipality had 2 primary classes and 42 students. Of the primary students, and 4.8% have a different mother language than the classroom language.

As of 2000, there were 4 students in Iffwil who came from another municipality, while 22 residents attended schools outside the municipality.
