= Bangerten =

- Former municipality
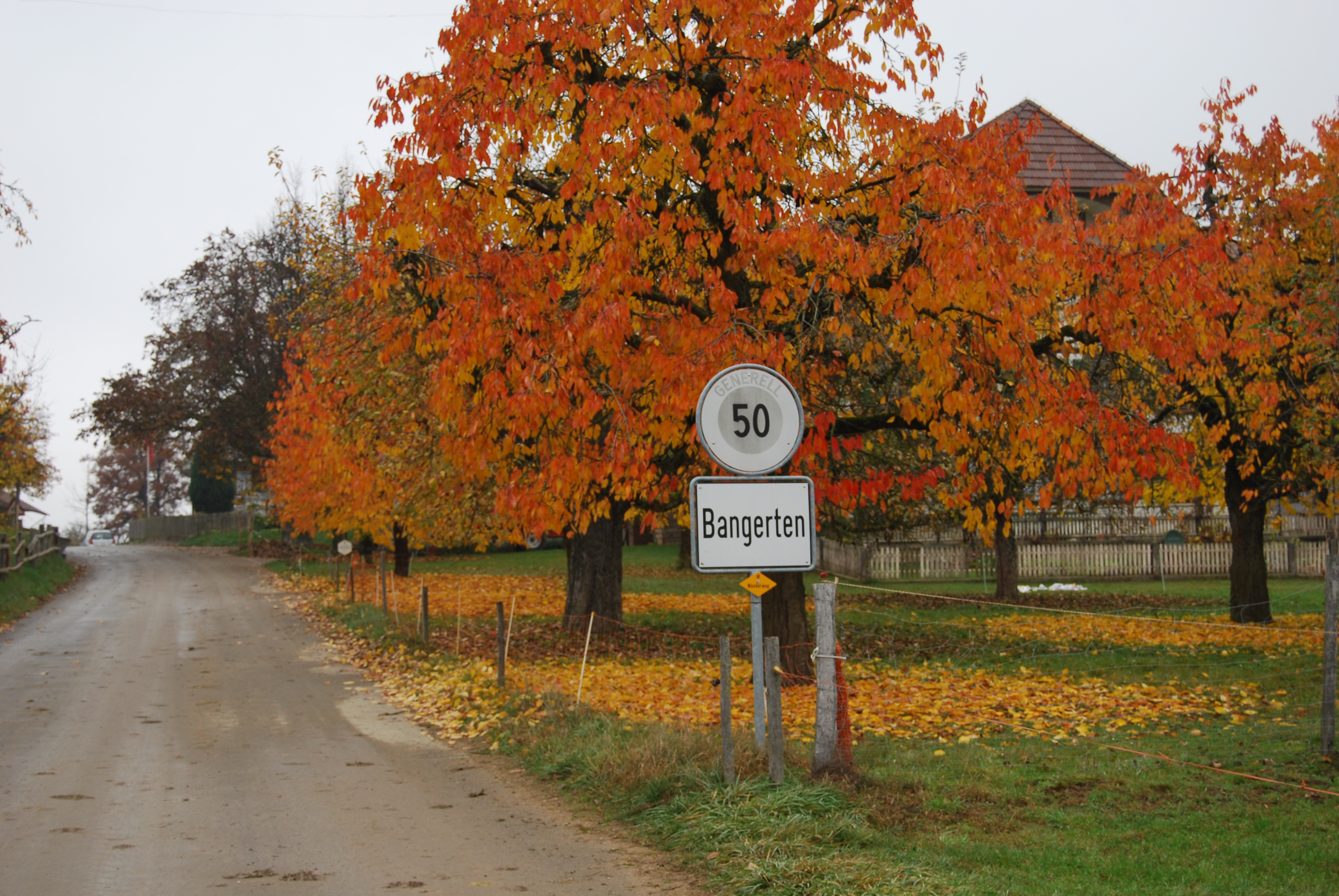
- Entrance to Bangerten village

- Flag Coat of arms
- Location of Bangerten
- Location within Switzerland Location within Canton of Bern
- Coordinates: 47°3′N 7°27′E
- Country: Switzerland
- Canton: Bern
- District: Seeland

Area
  - Total: 2.2 km^{2} (0.85 sq mi)
- Elevation: 586 m (1,923 ft)

Population (Dec 2014)
  - Total: 151
  - Density: 69/km^{2} (180/sq mi)
- Time zone: UTC+01:00 (CET)
  - Summer (DST): UTC+02:00 (CEST)
- Postal code: 3256
- SFOS number: 532
- ISO 3166 code: CH-BE
- Surrounded by: Iffwil, Rapperswil, Scheunen, Zuzwil
- Website: SFSO statistics

Bangerten is a former municipality in the Seeland administrative district in the canton of Bern in Switzerland. On 1 January 2016 it was absorbed into Rapperswil.

== History ==
Bangerten is first mentioned in 1263 as Bongarthen. Roman coins have been found in Bangerten. In the 13th and 14th Centuries the Order of St. John in Münchenbuchsee bought out most of the earlier land owners, including the Burgdorf Family von Steffisburg. Following the Secularization of the monasteries (1528), Bangerten became part of the Landvogtei of Münchenbuchsee.

The municipality has remained generally agrarian. In 1990, 24 of the 42 workers in the village worked in agriculture. Due to agreements with neighboring municipalities, the small municipality has been able to function with limited local infrastructure. Bangerten shares the vital records and welfare office with Etzelkofen, a primary school with Scheunen and a secondary school with Rapperswil.

== Geography ==
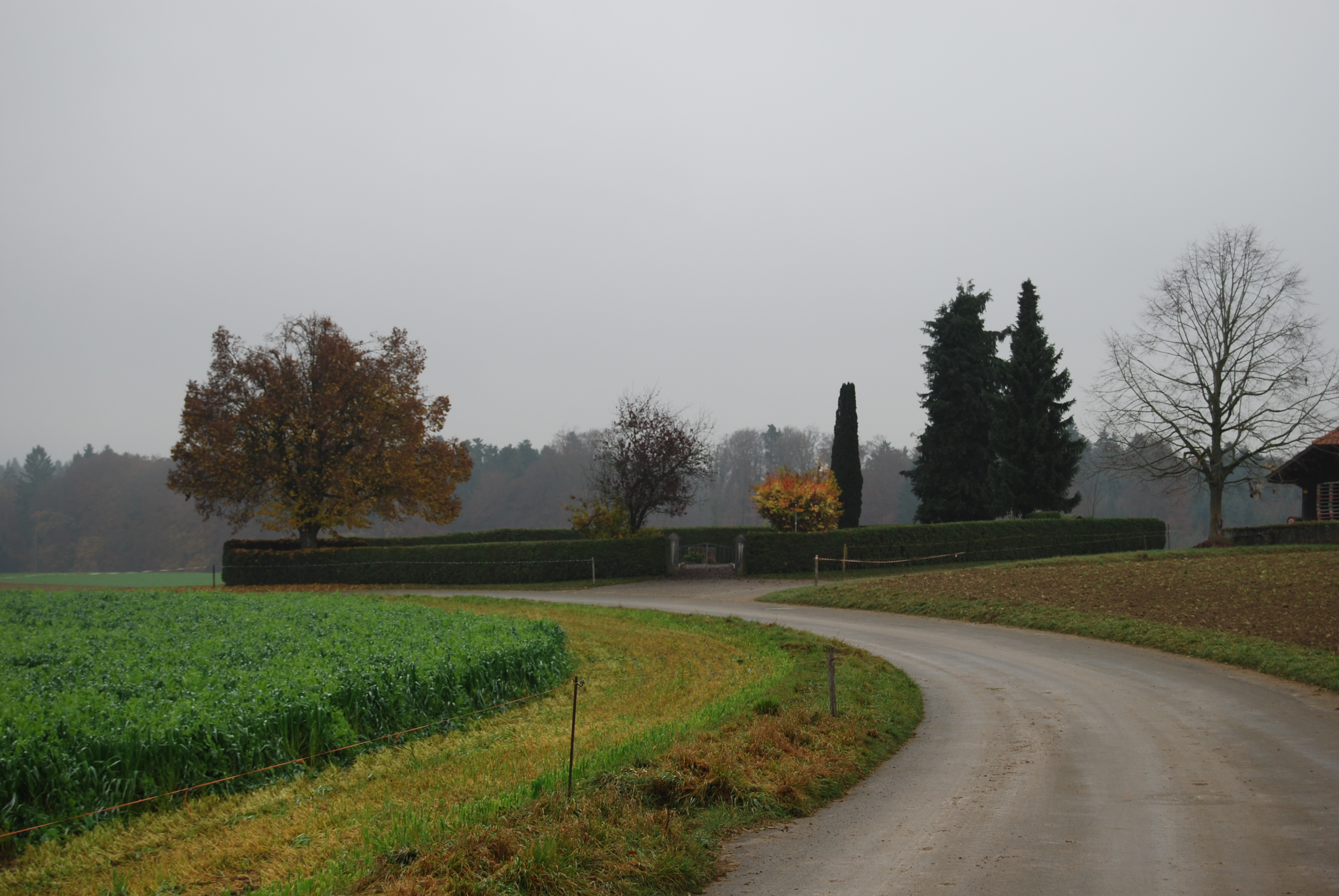
Bangerten cemetery

Bangerten had an area of 2.19 km^{2} (0.85 sq mi). Of this area, 1.36 km^{2} (0.53 mi^{2}) or 62.1% is used for agricultural purposes, while 0.7 km^{2} (0.27 mi^{2}) or 32.0% is forested. Of the rest of the land, 0.14 km^{2} (35 acres) or 6.4% is settled (buildings or roads).

Of the built up area, housing and buildings made up 3.2% and transportation infrastructure made up 3.2%. Out of the forested land, all of the forested land area is covered with heavy forests. Of the agricultural land, 49.8% is used for growing crops and 8.2% is pastures, while 4.1% is used for orchards or vine crops.

It included the village of Bangerten, Hohrain (formerly Taunersiedlung) as well as scattered farms. Since 1940 Bangerten belonged to the parish of Rapperswil (before 1940 it was Messen). Since 1924 they have had their own cemetery.

On 31 December 2009 Amtsbezirk Fraubrunnen, the municipality's former district, was dissolved. On the following day, 1 January 2010, it joined the newly created Verwaltungskreis Seeland.

== Coat of arms ==
The blazon of the municipal coat of arms is Gules issuant from a Base Vert an Apple Tree of the same fructed Or behind a wattled Fence of the last.

== Demographics ==
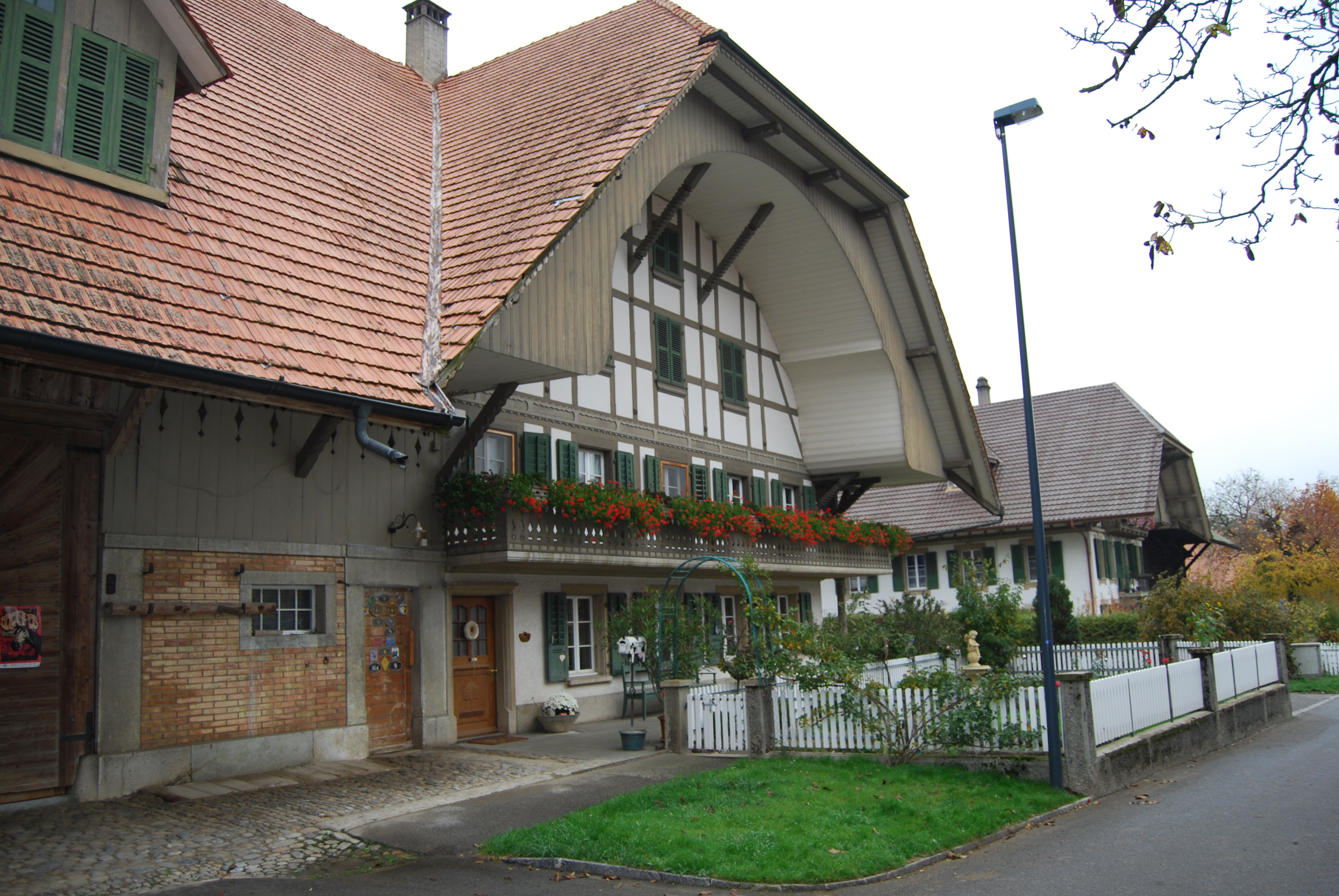
Half-timbered house in Bangerten

Bangerten had a population (as of 2014) of 151. As of 2010, 4.4% of the population are resident foreign nationals. Over the last 10 years (2000-2010) the population has changed at a rate of -3.1%. Migration accounted for 8%, while births and deaths accounted for -3.7%.

Most of the population (as of 2000) speaks German (148 or 93.7%) as their first language. Three people each speak French or Arabic.

As of 2008, the population was 48.7% male and 51.3% female. The population was made up of 74 Swiss men (46.8% of the population) and 3 (1.9%) non-Swiss men. There were 77 Swiss women (48.7%) and 4 (2.5%) non-Swiss women. Of the population in the municipality, 52 or about 32.9% were born in Bangerten and lived there in 2000. There were 78 or 49.4% who were born in the same canton, while 16 or 10.1% were born somewhere else in Switzerland, and 6 or 3.8% were born outside of Switzerland.

As of 2010, children and teenagers (0–19 years old) make up 19% of the population, while adults (20–64 years old) make up 69.6% and seniors (over 64 years old) make up 11.4%.

As of 2000, there were 66 people who were single and never married in the municipality. There were 76 married individuals, 8 widows or widowers and 8 individuals who are divorced.

As of 2000, there were 19 households that consist of only one person and 3 households with five or more people. In 2000, a total of 65 apartments (95.6% of the total) were permanently occupied, while 2 apartments (2.9%) were seasonally occupied and one apartment was empty. The vacancy rate for the municipality, in 2011, was 1.27%.

The historical population is given in the following chart:

== Sights ==
The entire village of Bangerten is designated as part of the Inventory of Swiss Heritage Sites.

== Politics ==
In the 2011 federal election the most popular party was the Swiss People's Party (SVP) which received 43.2% of the vote. The next three most popular parties were the Conservative Democratic Party (BDP) (21.4%), the Social Democratic Party (SP) (11.9%) and the Green Party (6.1%). In the federal election, a total of 68 votes were cast, and the voter turnout was 52.7%.

== Economy ==
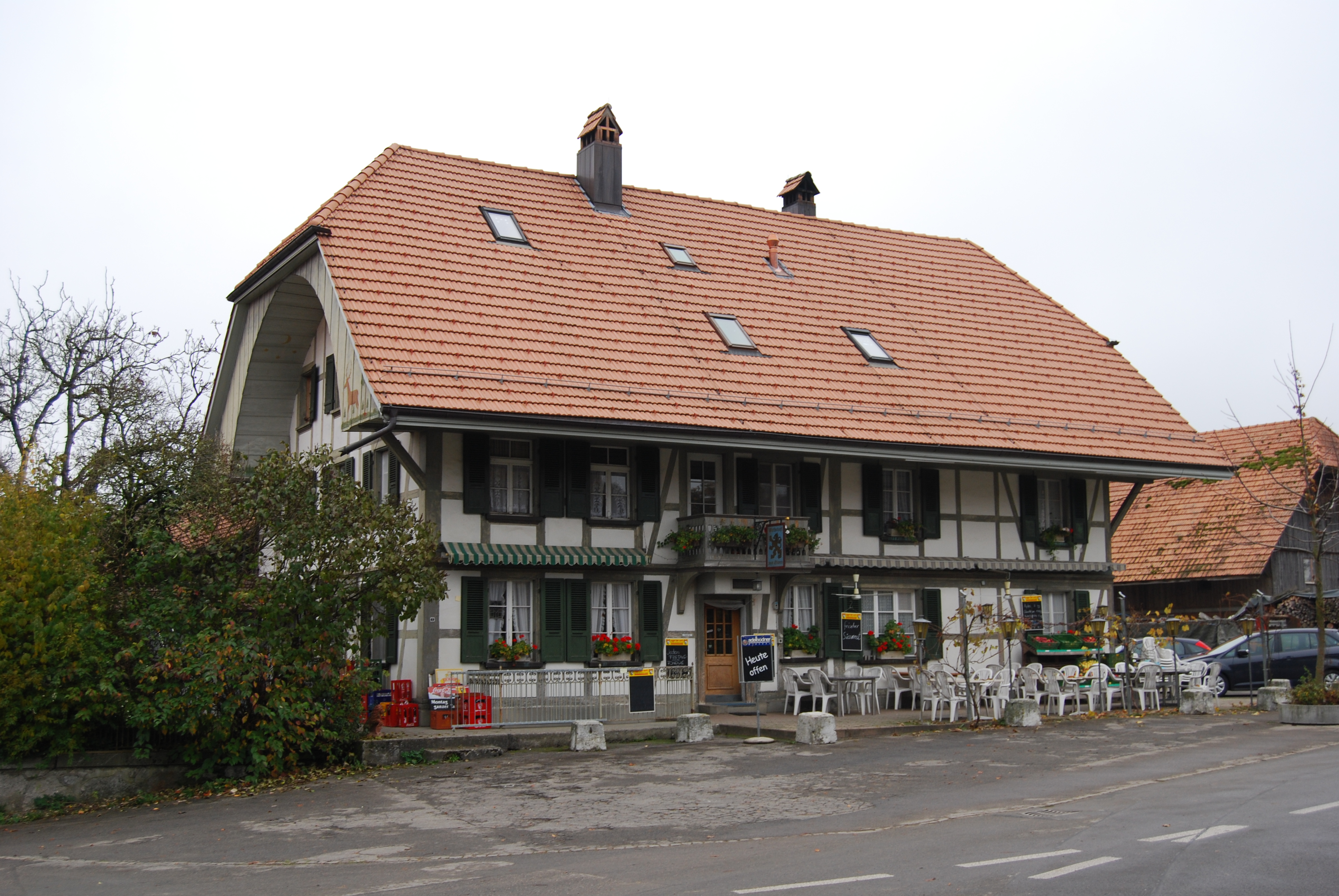
Restaurant Löwen in Bangerten

As of 2011, Bangerten had an unemployment rate of 1.87%. As of 2008, there were a total of 38 people employed in the municipality. Of these, there were 27 people employed in the primary economic sector and about 9 businesses involved in this sector. 1 person was employed in the secondary sector and there was 1 business in this sector. 10 people were employed in the tertiary sector, with 3 businesses in this sector. There were 97 residents of the municipality who were employed in some capacity, of which females made up 40.2% of the workforce.

In 2008 there were a total of 26 full-time equivalent jobs. The number of jobs in the primary sector was 18, all in agriculture. There was one secondary sector, manufacturing job. The number of jobs in the tertiary sector was 7, of which 2 were in wholesale or retail sales or the repair of motor vehicles and 5 were in a hotel or restaurant.

In 2000, there were 8 workers who commuted into the municipality and 63 workers who commuted away. The municipality is a net exporter of workers, with about 7.9 workers leaving the municipality for every one entering. Of the working population, 16.5% used public transportation to get to work, and 47.4% used a private car.

== Religion ==
From the 2000 census, 8 or 5.1% were Roman Catholic, while 128 or 81.0% belonged to the Swiss Reformed Church. Of the rest of the population, there was 1 individual who belongs to another Christian church. There was 1 individual who was Islamic. 17 (or about 10.76% of the population) belonged to no church, are agnostic or atheist, and 3 individuals (or about 1.90% of the population) did not answer the question.

== Education ==
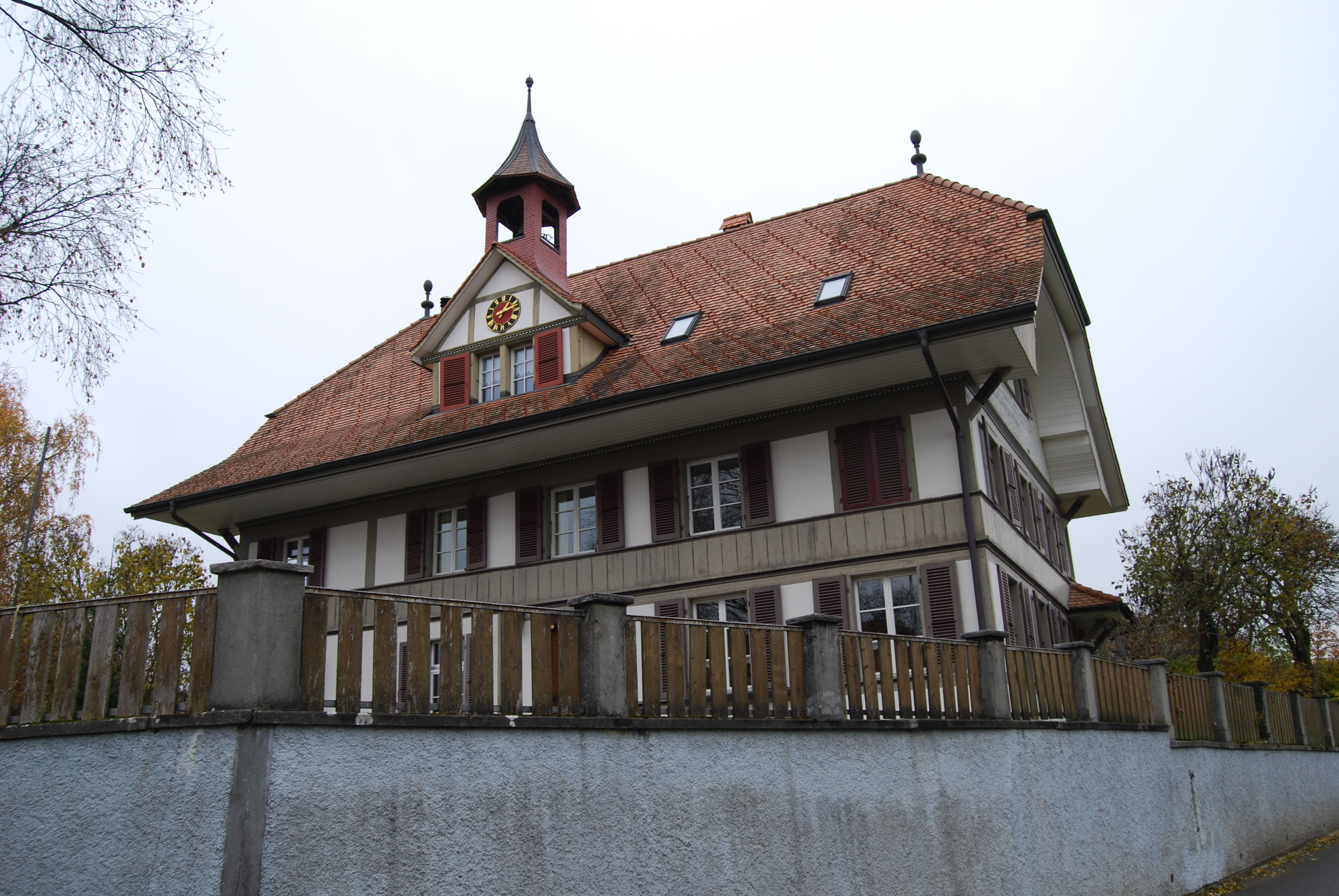
Old school house and municipal administration building

In Bangerten about 64 or (40.5%) of the population have completed non-mandatory upper secondary education, and 33 or (20.9%) have completed additional higher education (either university or a Fachhochschule). Of the 33 who completed tertiary schooling, 69.7% were Swiss men, 27.3% were Swiss women.

During the 2010–11 school year, there were no students attending school in Bangerten.

As of 2000, there were 13 students from Bangerten who attended schools outside the municipality.
