= Scheunen =

- Former municipality
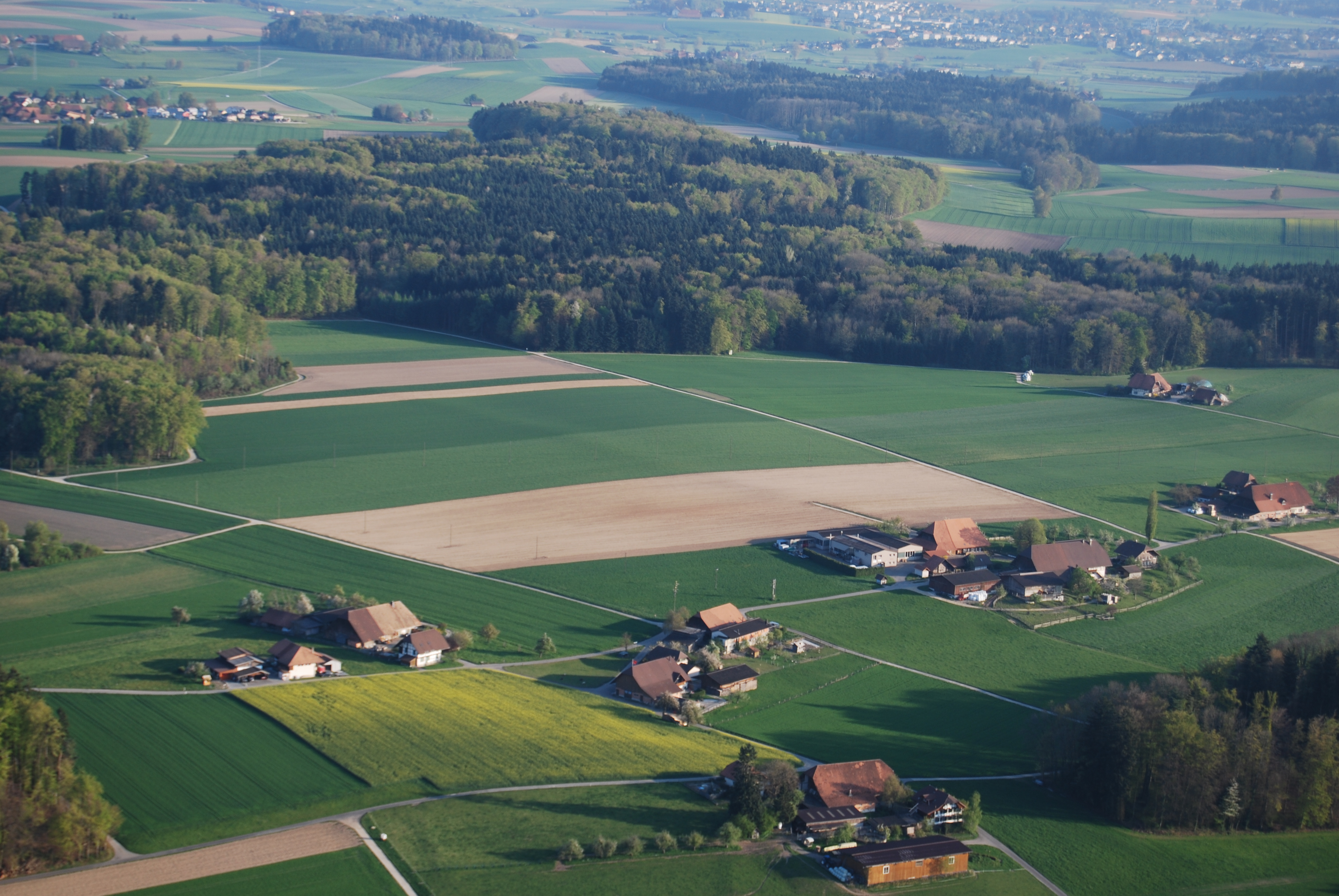
- Aerial view of Scheunen village

- Flag Coat of arms
- Location of Scheunen
- Location within Switzerland Location within Canton of Bern
- Coordinates: 47°4′N 7°27′E
- Country: Switzerland
- Canton: Bern
- District: Bern-Mittelland

Area
  - Total: 2.2 km^{2} (0.85 sq mi)
- Elevation: 575 m (1,886 ft)

Population (Dec 2011)
  - Total: 82
  - Density: 37/km^{2} (97/sq mi)
- Time zone: UTC+01:00 (CET)
  - Summer (DST): UTC+02:00 (CEST)
- Postal code: 3305
- SFOS number: 550
- ISO 3166 code: CH-BE
- Surrounded by: Bangerten, Brunnenthal (SO), Etzelkofen, Iffwil, Messen (SO), Rapperswil
- Website: SFSO statistics

Scheunen is a former municipality in the Bern-Mittelland administrative district in the canton of Bern in Switzerland. On 1 January 2014 the former municipalities of Scheunen and Münchringen merged into the municipality of Jegenstorf.

== History ==
Scheunen is first mentioned in 1226 as Schunon.

The oldest trace of a settlement in the area are Hallstatt era grave mounds at Steinholz and Junkholz. During the Early Middle Ages the grave mounds were used as a cemetery again. The settlements that today make up Scheunen were originally the two independent villages of Oberscheunen and Jegenstorf-Scheunen. They were part of the parishes of Jegenstorf and Messen-Scheunen. After 1530 they both joined the new Reformed parish of Messen in the Canton of Solothurn. They two villages formed a school district in 1795. However, they both remained politically independent until they were merged by decree in 1911. Starting in 2007, the municipal clerk in Iffwil assumed responsibility for Scheunen.

They were both originally part of the Kyburg low court of Jegenstorf. After the extinction of the Kyburg family in 1406, Bern acquired the villages and placed them under the court at Zollikofen. After the 1803 Act of Mediation they became part of the district of Fraubrunnen.

== Geography ==
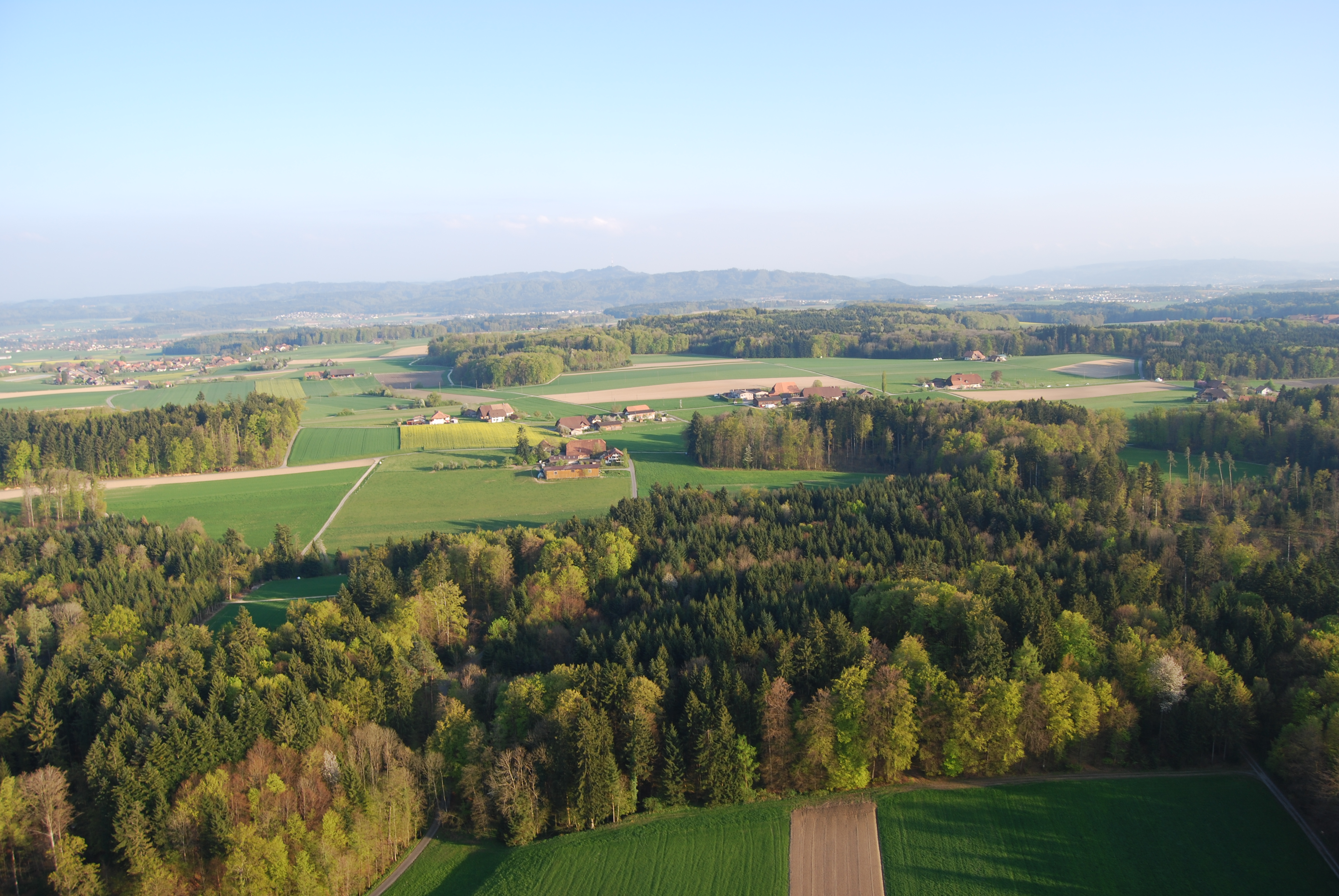
Aerial view of Scheunen village.

Before the merger, Scheunen had a total area of 2.2 km^{2} (0.85 mi^{2}). Of this area, 1 km^{2} (0.39 mi^{2}) or 45.9% is used for agricultural purposes, while 1.12 km^{2} (0.43 mi^{2}) or 51.4% is forested. Of the rest of the land, 0.07 km^{2} (17 acres) or 3.2% is settled (buildings or roads).

Of the built up area, housing and buildings made up 1.8% and transportation infrastructure made up 1.4%. Out of the forested land, all of the forested land area is covered with heavy forests. Of the agricultural land, 41.3% is used for growing crops and 3.7% is pastures.

Formerly the smallest Bernese municipality, it is located on the Rapperswil plateau. It consists of the hamlets of Scheunen and Oberscheunen.

On 31 December 2009 Amtsbezirk Fraubrunnen, the municipality's former district, was dissolved. On the following day, 1 January 2010, it joined the newly created Verwaltungskreis Bern-Mittelland.

== Coat of arms ==
The blazon of the municipal coat of arms is Per fess Or and Gules two Barns in pale counterchanged. The barns (German: Scheunen) make this an example of canting arms.

== Demographics ==
Scheunen had a population (as of 2011) of 82. As of 2010, 4.9% of the population are resident foreign nationals. Over the last 10 years (2000-2010) the population has changed at a rate of 30%. Migration accounted for 21.7%, while births and deaths accounted for 10%.

All of the population (as of 2000) speaks German as their first language.

As of 2008, the population was 49.4% male and 50.6% female. The population was made up of 36 Swiss men (44.4% of the population) and 4 (4.9%) non-Swiss men. There were 41 Swiss women (50.6%) and (0.0%) non-Swiss women. Of the population in the municipality, 26 or about 45.6% were born in Scheunen and lived there in 2000. There were 24 or 42.1% who were born in the same canton, while 5 or 8.8% were born somewhere else in Switzerland, and or 0.0% were born outside of Switzerland.

As of 2010, children and teenagers (0–19 years old) make up 28.4% of the population, while adults (20–64 years old) make up 58% and seniors (over 64 years old) make up 13.6%.

As of 2000, there were 24 people who were single and never married in the municipality. There were 29 married individuals, 3 widows or widowers and 1 individuals who are divorced.

As of 2000, there were 6 households that consist of only one person and 1 households with five or more people. In 2000, a total of 22 apartments (84.6% of the total) were permanently occupied, while 3 apartments (11.5%) were seasonally occupied and one apartment was empty. The vacancy rate for the municipality, in 2011, was 7.41%.

The historical population is given in the following chart:

== Politics ==
In the 2011 federal election the most popular party was the Swiss People's Party (SVP) which received 80.7% of the vote. The next three most popular parties were the Conservative Democratic Party (BDP) (13.6%), the Green Party (2.1%) and the Christian Democratic People's Party (CVP) (1.2%). In the federal election, a total of 37 votes were cast, and the voter turnout was 64.9%.

== Economy ==
As of 2011, Scheunen had an unemployment rate of 0%. As of 2008, there were a total of 33 people employed in the municipality. Of these, there were 18 people employed in the primary economic sector and about 7 businesses involved in this sector. 10 people were employed in the secondary sector and there were 3 businesses in this sector. 5 people were employed in the tertiary sector, with 1 business in this sector. There were 35 residents of the municipality who were employed in some capacity, of which females made up 45.7% of the workforce.

In 2008 there were a total of 24 full-time equivalent jobs. The number of jobs in the primary sector was 13, all in agriculture. The number of jobs in the secondary sector was 7 of which 4 or (57.1%) were in manufacturing and 3 (42.9%) were in construction. The number of jobs in the tertiary sector was 4, all of which were technical professionals or scientists.

In 2000, there were 23 workers who commuted away from the municipality. Of the working population, 8.6% used public transportation to get to work, and 54.3% used a private car.

== Religion ==
From the 2000 census, 54 or 94.7% belonged to the Swiss Reformed Church while there was one person who was Roman Catholic.

== Education ==
In Scheunen about 18 or (31.6%) of the population have completed non-mandatory upper secondary education, and 10 or (17.5%) have completed additional higher education (either university or a Fachhochschule). Of the 10 who completed tertiary schooling, 6 were Swiss men and 4 were Swiss women.

During the 2010-11 school year, there were no students attending school in Scheunen.

As of 2000, there were 6 students from Scheunen who attended schools outside the municipality.
