= Rapperswil, Bern =

Rapperswil
- Municipality
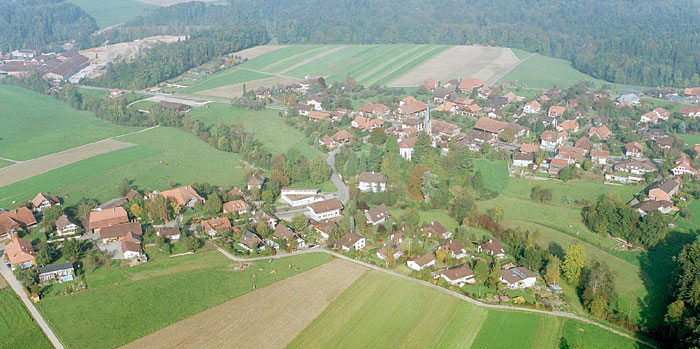
- Aerial view of Rapperswil village

- Flag Coat of arms
- Location of Rapperswil
- Location within Switzerland Location within Canton of Bern
- Coordinates: 47°4′N 7°25′E
- Country: Switzerland
- Canton: Bern
- District: Seeland

Area
  - Total: 18.2 km^{2} (7.0 sq mi)
- Elevation: 521 m (1,709 ft)

Population (December 2020)
  - Total: 2,592
  - Density: 142/km^{2} (369/sq mi)
- Time zone: UTC+01:00 (CET)
  - Summer (DST): UTC+02:00 (CEST)
- Postal code: 3255, 3256, 3251
- SFOS number: 310
- ISO 3166 code: CH-BE
- Surrounded by: Scheunen, Bangerten, Zuzwil, Deisswil bei Münchenbuchsee, Münchenbuchsee, Schüpfen, Grossaffoltern, Wengi, Ruppoldsried, and Messen (in the Canton of Solothurn)
- Website: www.rapperswil-be.ch

Rapperswil (Swiss Standard German pronunciation: [ˈrapərsˌvɪl]) is a municipality in the Seeland administrative district in the canton of Bern in Switzerland. It lies 13 km (8.1 mi) north of the capital Bern. On 1 January 2013 the former municipality of Ruppoldsried merged into Rapperswil. On 1 January 2016 the former municipality of Bangerten merged into Rapperswil.

== History ==
Aerial view (1950)

Rapperswil is first mentioned in 1241 as Raverswiler.

The oldest trace of a settlement in Rapperswil is a Roman era settlement or estate on the site of the current village church. This, together with a foundation at Unteren Leenwald, money at Moosaffoltern (coins) and brick fragments at Holzhäusern indicate that there were scattered small settlements here during the Roman era. Grave mounds and a High Medieval earthen fort show that the area remained settled after the collapse of the Roman Empire. The village was originally part of the Zähringen lands. After the Zähringen family died out, it was inherited by the Kyburgs.

Starting in 1262, the low court rights and pieces of property were gradually sold or gifted to Frienisberg Abbey and other monasteries. The lower court rights were held by a number of monasteries. The court in Rapperswil and Wierezwil was held by Frienisberg Abbey, Seewil and Moosaffoltern by Münchenbuchsee, Bittwil by Fraubrunnen and Frauchwil by the Cathedral chapter of St. Vinzenz in Bern. Dieterswil-Zimlisberg-Zuzwil had their own court in the community. The high court for all the villages was held by the Kyburg bailiffs until 1406, when it went to the District Court in Zollikofen. In 1528, these villages came under Bernese control and the various lower courts were divided among five bailiffs. They were first united in 1803 in the Aarberg District.

A village priest was first mentioned in 1241. In 1263, the Kyburgs granted the church to Frienisberg Abbey. The old church was replaced by a new building in 1860–62. The parsonage is located on the foundations of a medieval sanctuary.

In 1849-52 the Bern-Buren road was built which helped tie the isolated farming villages together into a community. The population in the municipality declined from 1850 to 1940 as the farms changed from growing crops to dairy farming and became increasingly mechanized. However, agriculture remained an important part of the economy. In 2005, just over one-quarter of all jobs in the municipality were in agriculture. In addition to agriculture, there are several small businesses and a brick factory in Rapperswil.

=== Ruppoldsried ===
Ruppoldsried is first mentioned in 1279 as Ruopolsriet.

During the Late Middle Ages the village was owned by the von Ergeuw family from Burgdorf. The family is mentioned in 1373 during a dispute over land use near the village. At some time before 1506, Konrad von Ergeuw sold the village to Bern. Under Bernese control Ruppoldsried was placed under the control and low court of Mülchi. It was part of the high court of Zollikofen.

The residents were part of the parish of Messen in Solothurn. In the 16th century, when Messen embraced the Protestant Reformation and adopted the Reformed faith, Ruppoldsried followed.

Beginning in the 19th century local farmers began to raise dairy cattle along with traditional agriculture. The village dairy was built in 1884. Today Ruppoldsried and Messen form an intercantonal school district. The village has regular Postauto service from Bern and Lyss. It has retained much of its rural, agrarian character, today nearly two thirds of all jobs in Ruppoldsried are in agriculture.

=== Bangerten ===
Bangerten is first mentioned in 1263 as Bongarthen. Roman coins have been found in Bangerten. In the 13th and 14th Centuries the Order of St. John in Münchenbuchsee bought out most of the earlier land owners, including the Burgdorf Family von Steffisburg. Following the Secularization of the monasteries (1528), Bangerten became part of the Landvogtei of Münchenbuchsee.

The municipality has remained generally agrarian. In 1990, 24 of the 42 workers in the village worked in agriculture. Due to agreements with neighboring municipalities, the small municipality has been able to function with limited local infrastructure. Bangerten shares the vital records and welfare office with Etzelkofen, a primary school with Scheunen and a secondary school with Rapperswil.

== Geography ==
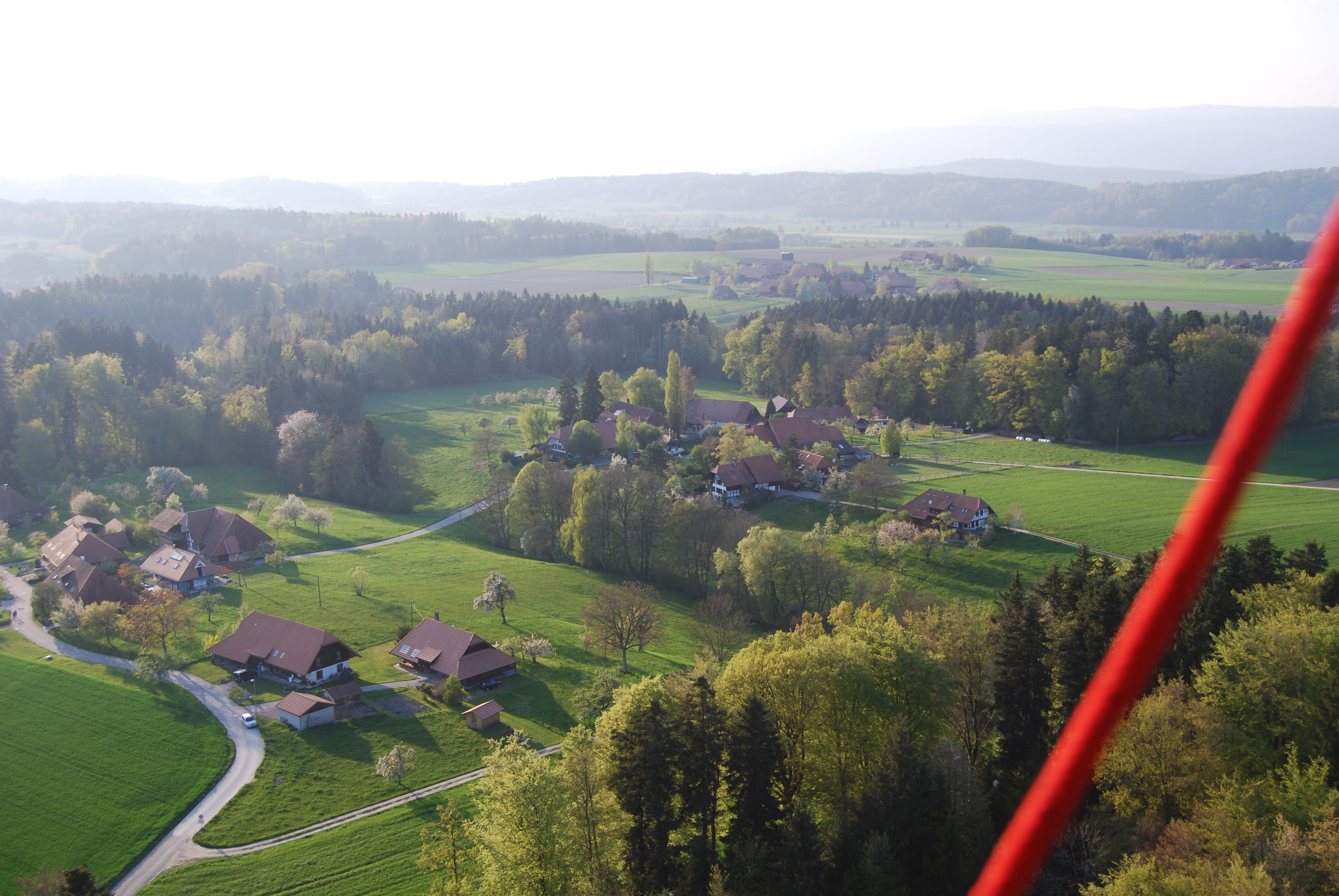
Aerial view of Vogelsang village in Rapperswil

Rapperswil has an area of 22.58 km^{2} (8.72 sq mi). Of the area before the 2016 merger, 11.4 km^{2} (4.4 mi^{2}) or 62.7% is used for agricultural purposes, while 5.21 km^{2} (2.01 mi^{2}) or 28.6% is forested. Of the rest of the land, 1.57 km^{2} (0.61 mi^{2}) or 8.6% is settled (buildings or roads), 0.01 km^{2} (2.5 acres) or 0.1% is either rivers or lakes and 0.01 km^{2} (2.5 acres) or 0.1% is unproductive land.

Of the built up area, housing and buildings made up 3.4% and transportation infrastructure made up 4.1%. Out of the forested land, all of the forested land area is covered with heavy forests. Of the agricultural land, 49.1% is used for growing crops and 12.3% is pastures, while 1.3% is used for orchards or vine crops. All the water in the municipality is flowing water.

It lies on the Rapperswil Plateau in the Swiss Plateau and stretches between the valleys of the Limpach in the north and the Lyss in the south.

=== Communities ===
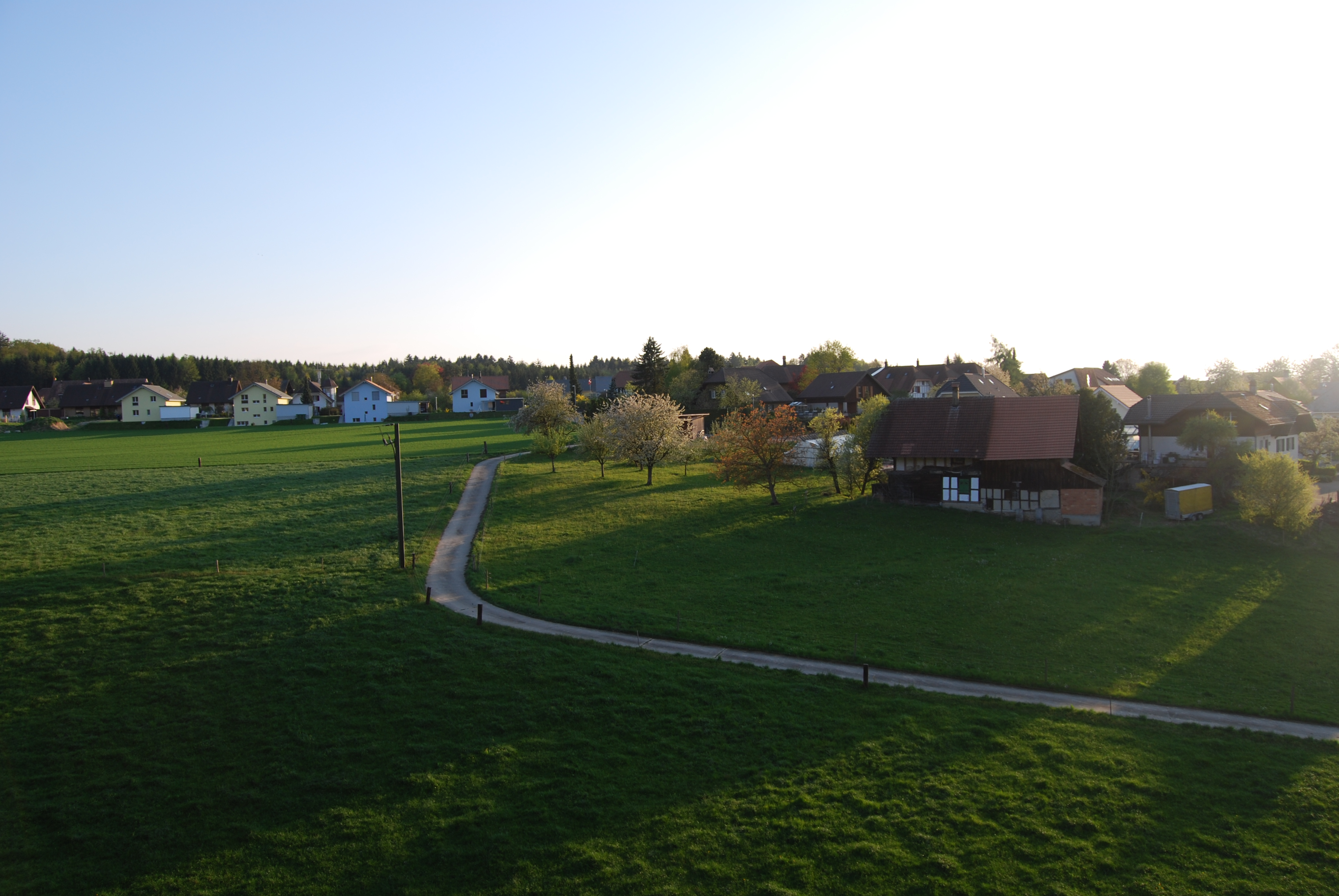
Vogelsang village

There are ten communities within the municipality:

- Rapperswil (521 m (1,709 ft)), at the entrance of the Wilbach stream, with the hamlet Habanger (515 m (1,690 ft)) west of the Wilbach, population 583.
- Wierezwil (521 m (1,709 ft)) on the western plateau, with the hamlet Rüberi (523 m (1,716 ft)), population 164.
- Frauchwil (503 m (1,650 ft)) in the valley of the Hohschwerzibach stream, population 81.
- Zimlisberg (527 m (1,729 ft)) on the eastern plateau, with the hamlet Holzhäusern (522 m (1,713 ft)), population 121.
- Bittwil (552 m (1,811 ft)) on the plateau south of the Limpach, population 68.
- Vogelsang (539 m (1,768 ft)) in a clearing in the Buechwald forest, population 58.
- Seewil (554 m (1,818 ft)) on the plateau between the Hardwald forest and Äckenberg, population 209.
- Dieterswil (562 m (1,844 ft)) on the plateau north of Äckenberg, population 262.
- Moosaffoltern (584 m (1,916 ft)) on the plateau south of Oberholzes, in the Moossee valley, population 90.
- Lätti (540 m (1,770 ft)) in the northern valley branch of the Moossee valley, population 449.

== Coat of arms ==
The blazon of the municipal coat of arms is Per fess Argent and Gules in chief a Crow passant Sable.

== Demographics ==
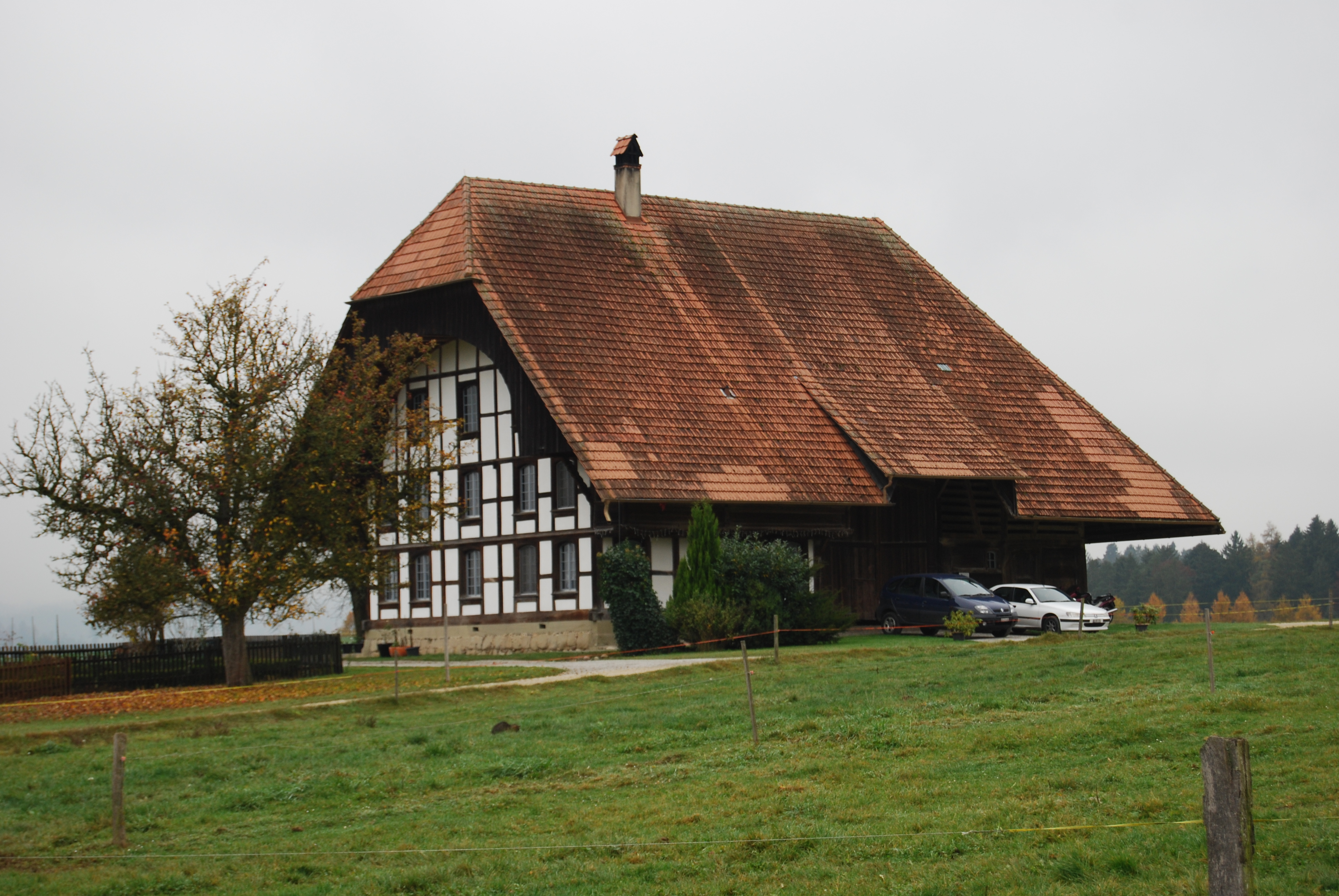
Half-Timbered house in Moosaffoltern

Rapperswil has a population (as of December 2020) of 2,592. As of 2010, 4.1% of the population are resident foreign nationals. Over the last 10 years (2000–2010) the population has changed at a rate of 4.4%. Migration accounted for 4%, while births and deaths accounted for 0.9%.

Most of the population (as of 2000) speaks German (1,898 or 95.4%) as their first language, French is the second most common (28 or 1.4%) and Albanian is the third (14 or 0.7%). There are 7 people who speak Italian and 1 person who speaks Romansh.

As of 2008, the population was 50.9% male and 49.1% female. The population was made up of 1,030 Swiss men (48.8% of the population) and 45 (2.1%) non-Swiss men. There were 995 Swiss women (47.1%) and 41 (1.9%) non-Swiss women. Of the population in the municipality, 740 or about 37.2% were born in Rapperswil and lived there in 2000. There were 829 or 41.7% who were born in the same canton, while 233 or 11.7% were born somewhere else in Switzerland, and 129 or 6.5% were born outside of Switzerland.

As of 2010, children and teenagers (0–19 years old) make up 22.1% of the population, while adults (20–64 years old) make up 60.5% and seniors (over 64 years old) make up 17.3%.

As of 2000, there were 810 people who were single and never married in the municipality. There were 1,025 married individuals, 94 widows or widowers and 61 individuals who are divorced.

As of 2000, there were 200 households that consist of only one person and 77 households with five or more people. In 2000, a total of 748 apartments (92.2% of the total) were permanently occupied, while 47 apartments (5.8%) were seasonally occupied and 16 apartments (2.0%) were empty. As of 2010, the construction rate of new housing units was 2.4 new units per 1000 residents. The vacancy rate for the municipality, in 2011, was 0.31%.

== Historic Population ==
The historical population is given in the following chart:

== Sights ==
The entire village of Bangerten is designated as part of the Inventory of Swiss Heritage Sites.

== Politics ==
In the 2011 federal election the most popular party was the SVP which received 41.4% of the vote. The next three most popular parties were the BDP Party (18.6%), the SPS (14.3%) and the Green Party (8%). In the federal election, a total of 892 votes were cast, and the voter turnout was 55.0%.

== Economy ==
As of 2011, Rapperswil had an unemployment rate of 0.91%. As of 2008, there were a total of 717 people employed in the municipality. Of these, there were 187 people employed in the primary economic sector and about 66 businesses involved in this sector. 263 people were employed in the secondary sector and there were 30 businesses in this sector. 267 people were employed in the tertiary sector, with 65 businesses in this sector.

In 2008 there were a total of 557 full-time equivalent jobs. The number of jobs in the primary sector was 117, all of which were in agriculture. The number of jobs in the secondary sector was 245 of which 162 or (66.1%) were in manufacturing and 79 (32.2%) were in construction. The number of jobs in the tertiary sector was 195. In the tertiary sector; 60 or 30.8% were in wholesale or retail sales or the repair of motor vehicles, 10 or 5.1% were in the movement and storage of goods, 35 or 17.9% were in a hotel or restaurant, 2 or 1.0% were in the information industry, 1 was the insurance or financial industry, 29 or 14.9% were technical professionals or scientists, 31 or 15.9% were in education and 8 or 4.1% were in health care.

In 2000, there were 211 workers who commuted into the municipality and 728 workers who commuted away. The municipality is a net exporter of workers, with about 3.5 workers leaving the municipality for every one entering. Of the working population, 18.4% used public transportation to get to work, and 50.5% used a private car.

== Religion ==
From the 2000 census, 140 or 7.0% were Roman Catholic, while 1,587 or 79.7% belonged to the Swiss Reformed Church. Of the rest of the population, there were 8 members of an Orthodox church (or about 0.40% of the population), there was 1 individual who belongs to the Christian Catholic Church, and there were 53 individuals (or about 2.66% of the population) who belonged to another Christian church. There were 2 individuals (or about 0.10% of the population) who were Jewish, and 15 (or about 0.75% of the population) who were Islamic. There were 10 individuals who were Hindu and 1 individual who belonged to another church. 123 (or about 6.18% of the population) belonged to no church, are agnostic or atheist, and 75 individuals (or about 3.77% of the population) did not answer the question.

== Education ==
In Rapperswil about 794 or (39.9%) of the population have completed non-mandatory upper secondary education, and 283 or (14.2%) have completed additional higher education (either university or a Fachhochschule). Of the 283 who completed tertiary schooling, 70.0% were Swiss men, 25.4% were Swiss women, 3.5% were non-Swiss men.

The Canton of Bern school system provides one year of non-obligatory Kindergarten, followed by six years of Primary school. This is followed by three years of obligatory lower Secondary school where the students are separated according to ability and aptitude. Following the lower Secondary students may attend additional schooling or they may enter an apprenticeship.

During the 2009–10 school year, there were a total of 370 students attending classes in Rapperswil. There were 2 kindergarten classes with a total of 40 students in the municipality. Of the kindergarten students, 5.0% were permanent or temporary residents of Switzerland (not citizens) and 22.5% have a different mother language than the classroom language. The municipality had 8 primary classes and 143 students. Of the primary students, 6.3% were permanent or temporary residents of Switzerland (not citizens) and 8.4% have a different mother language than the classroom language. During the same year, there were 10 lower secondary classes with a total of 187 students.

As of 2000, there were 64 students in Rapperswil who came from another municipality, while 77 residents attended schools outside the municipality.
