= Zuzwil, Bern =

Zuzwil
- Municipality
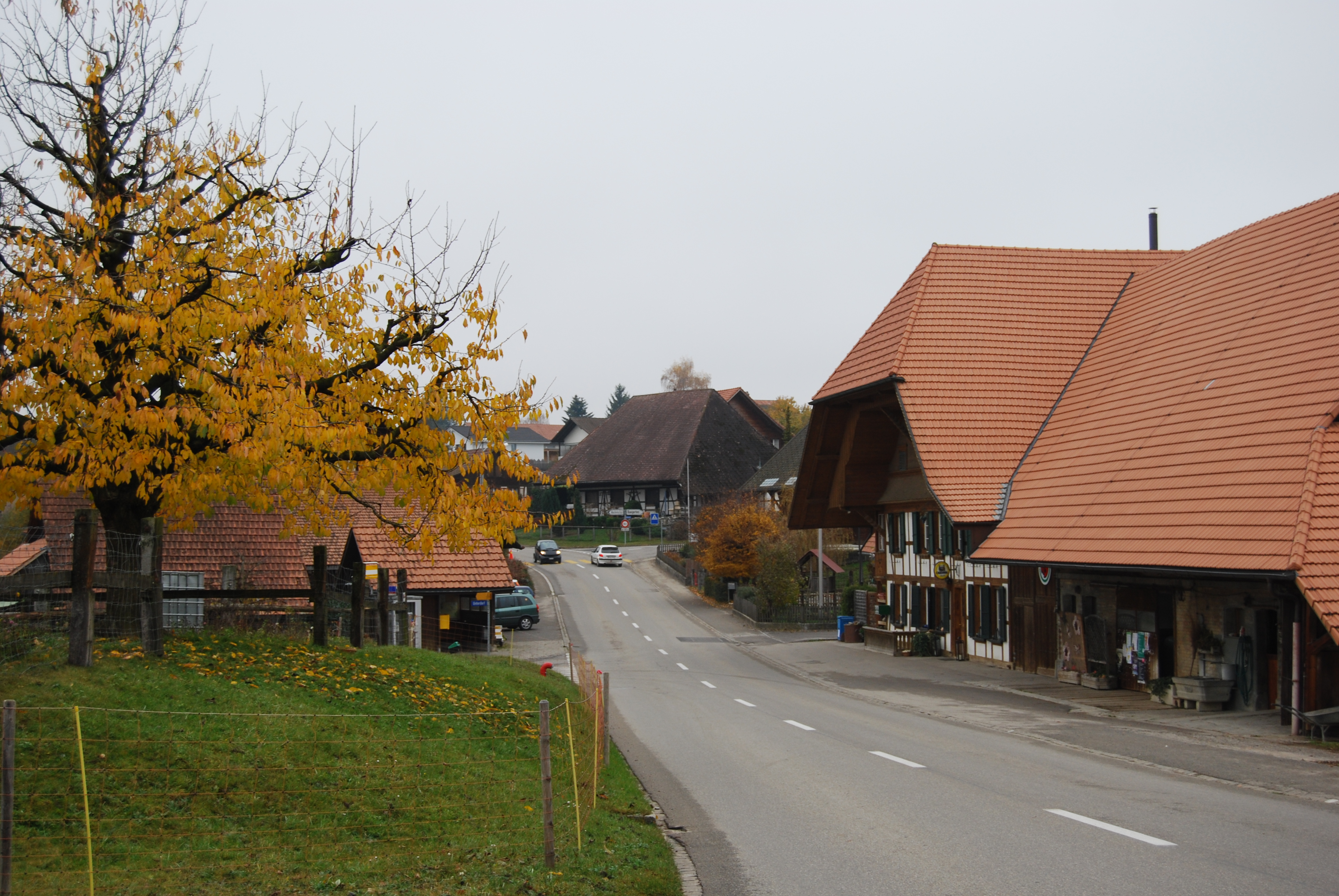

- Flag Coat of arms
- Location of Zuzwil
- Location within Switzerland Location within Canton of Bern
- Coordinates: 47°3′N 7°28′E
- Country: Switzerland
- Canton: Bern
- District: Bern-Mittelland

Government
  - Executive: Gemeinderat with 5 members
  - Mayor: Gemeindepräsident(in); Bernhard Hofer (as of 2026)

Area
  - Total: 3.5 km^{2} (1.4 sq mi)
- Elevation: 565 m (1,854 ft)

Population (December 2020)
  - Total: 563
  - Density: 160/km^{2} (420/sq mi)
- Time zone: UTC+01:00 (CET)
  - Summer (DST): UTC+02:00 (CEST)
- Postal code: 3303
- SFOS number: 557
- ISO 3166 code: CH-BE
- Surrounded by: Ballmoos, Bangerten, Deisswil bei Münchenbuchsee, Iffwil, Jegenstorf, Rapperswil
- Website: https://www.zuzwil-be.ch/

Zuzwil is a municipality in the Bern-Mittelland administrative district in the canton of Bern in Switzerland.

== History ==
Zuzwil is first mentioned in 1249 as Zuozwile.

The oldest trace of a settlement in the area are some ruined Roman era walls. During the 13th and 14th centuries, the Counts of Kyburg, Frienisberg Abbey, Fraubrunnen Abbey and Münchenbuchsee Commandery all owned land in Zuzwil. Once Bern acquired Zuzwil, they combined it with the villages of Vogelsang, Zimlisberg and Dieterswil (all three are now part of Rapperswil and placed it under a Bernese mayor who lived in Dieterswil. This organization existed until the 1798 French invasion and the creation of the Helvetic Republic. With the Act of Mediation, Zuzwil became part of the new Fraubrunnen district.

Zuzwil is part of the parish of Jegenstorf.

The village remained largely rural and agricultural until about 1965, when it began to become a commuter town for the nearby city of Bern. By 2000, slightly over three-quarters of the working population commutes to Bern, Jegenstorf or other towns. It forms the center of a school district that includes Iffwil and Ballmoos.

== Geography ==
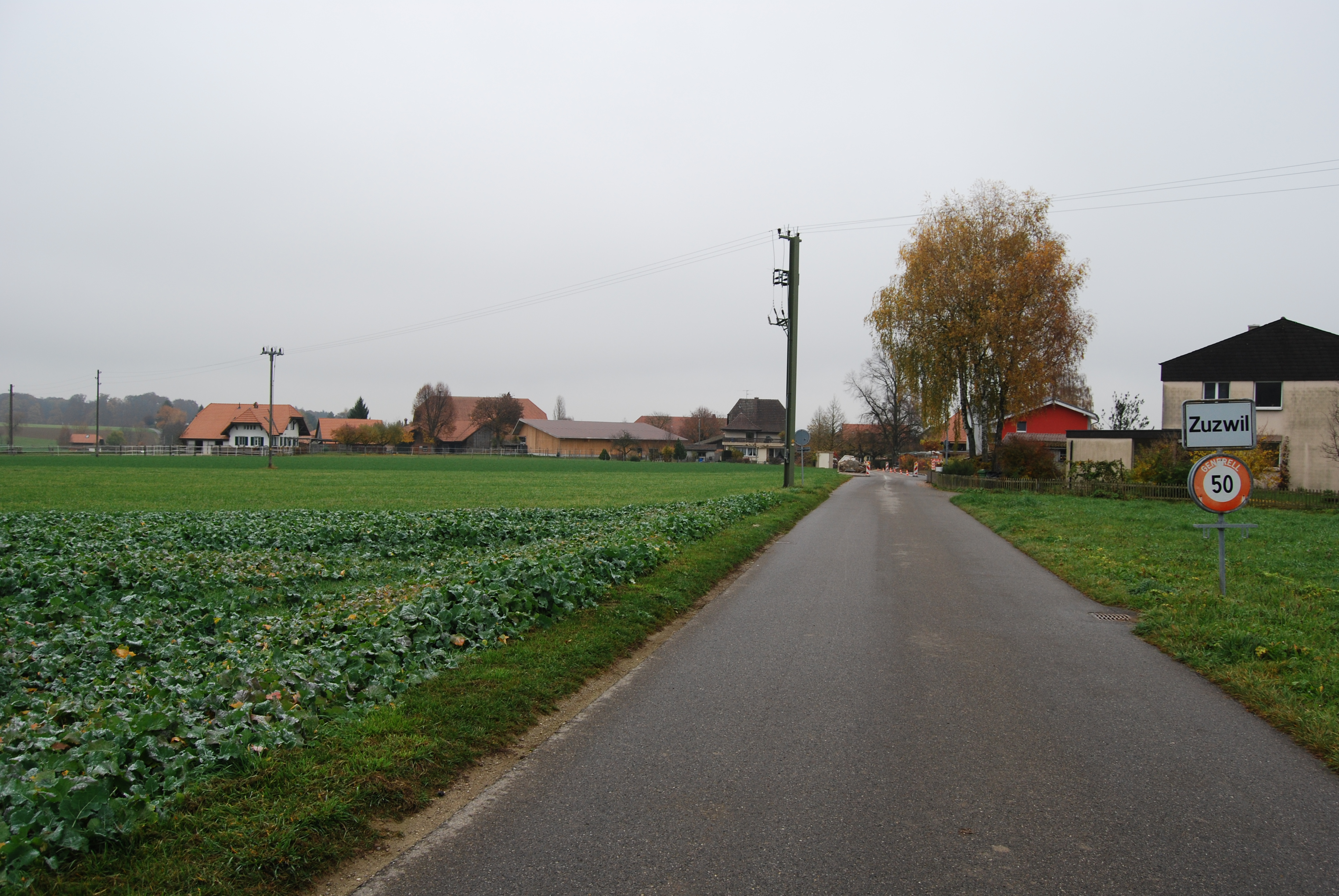
Fields on the outskirts of Zuzwil

Zuzwil has an area of 3.47 km^{2} (1.34 sq mi). Of this area, 2.31 km^{2} (0.89 mi^{2}) or 66.8% is used for agricultural purposes, while 0.9 km^{2} (0.35 mi^{2}) or 26.0% is forested. Of the rest of the land, 0.26 km^{2} (0.10 mi^{2}) or 7.5% is settled (buildings or roads), 0.01 km^{2} (2.5 acres) or 0.3% is either rivers or lakes.

Of the built up area, housing and buildings made up 4.9% and transportation infrastructure made up 2.0%. Out of the forested land, all of the forested land area is covered with heavy forests. Of the agricultural land, 57.8% is used for growing crops and 7.2% is pastures, while 1.7% is used for orchards or vine crops. All the water in the municipality is flowing water.

The municipality is located on the eastern side of the Rapperswil plateau at the intersection of the Münchenbuchsee-Mülchi road and the Jegenstorf-Rapperswil road.

On 31 December 2009 Amtsbezirk Fraubrunnen, the municipality's former district, was dissolved. On the following day, 1 January 2010, it joined the newly created Verwaltungskreis Bern-Mittelland.

== Coat of arms ==
The blazon of the municipal coat of arms is Or three Shovel-heads Azure.

== Demographics ==
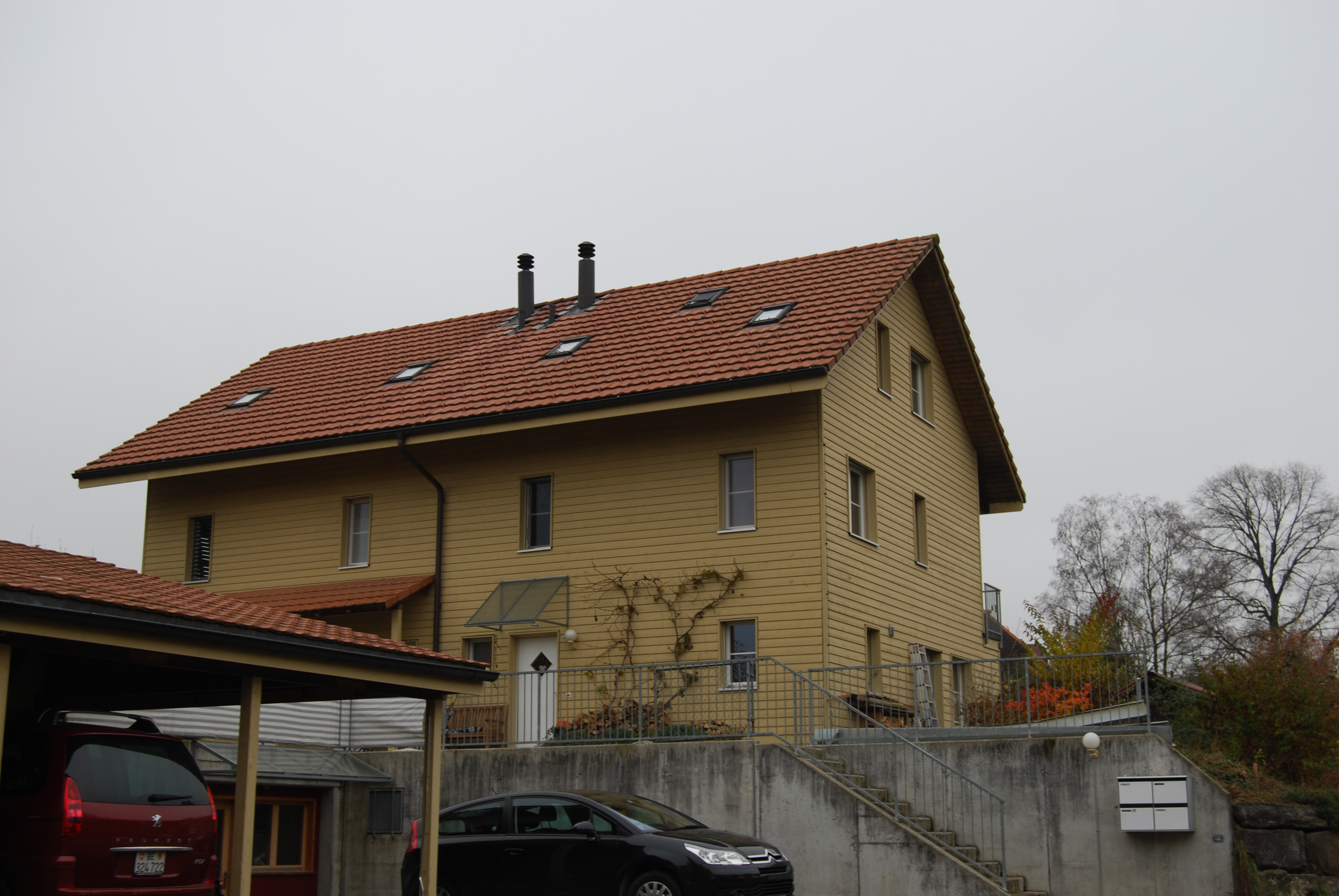
Modern house in Zuzwil

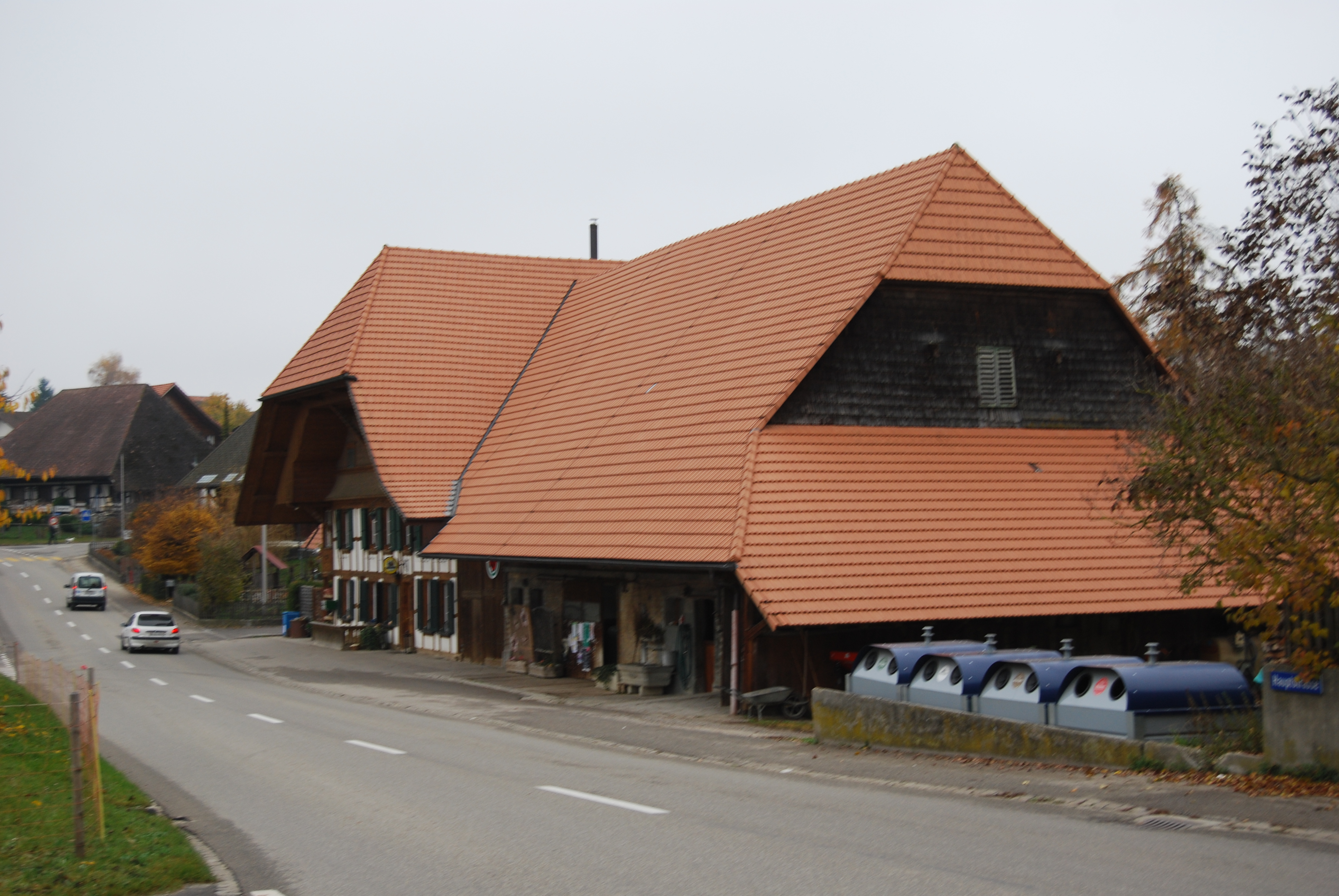
Traditional Bernese farmhouse and barn in Zuzwil

Zuzwil has a population (as of December 2020) of 563. As of 2010, 3.7% of the population are resident foreign nationals. Over the last 10 years (2000–2010) the population has changed at a rate of 23.6%. Migration accounted for 16.5%, while births and deaths accounted for 4.5%.

Most of the population (as of 2000) speaks German (460 or 97.0%) as their first language, French is the second most common (6 or 1.3%) and English is the third (3 or 0.6%).

As of 2008, the population was 50.2% male and 49.8% female. The population was made up of 276 Swiss men (48.1% of the population) and 12 (2.1%) non-Swiss men. There were 277 Swiss women (48.3%) and 9 (1.6%) non-Swiss women. Of the population in the municipality, 140 or about 29.5% were born in Zuzwil and lived there in 2000. There were 200 or 42.2% who were born in the same canton, while 87 or 18.4% were born somewhere else in Switzerland, and 36 or 7.6% were born outside of Switzerland.

As of 2010, children and teenagers (0–19 years old) make up 22.5% of the population, while adults (20–64 years old) make up 55.9% and seniors (over 64 years old) make up 21.6%.

As of 2000, there were 172 people who were single and never married in the municipality. There were 267 married individuals, 17 widows or widowers and 18 individuals who are divorced.

As of 2000, there were 33 households that consist of only one person and 18 households with five or more people. In 2000, a total of 183 apartments (94.3% of the total) were permanently occupied, while 8 apartments (4.1%) were seasonally occupied and 3 apartments (1.5%) were empty. The vacancy rate for the municipality, in 2011, was 0.43%.

The historical population is given in the following chart:

== Politics ==
In the 2011 federal election the most popular party was the Swiss People's Party (SVP) which received 31.5% of the vote. The next three most popular parties were the Conservative Democratic Party (BDP) (28.6%), the Social Democratic Party (SP) (13.6%) and the FDP.The Liberals (6.5%). In the federal election, a total of 279 votes were cast, and the voter turnout was 61.5%.

== Economy ==
As of 2011, Zuzwil had an unemployment rate of 1.31%. As of 2008, there were a total of 60 people employed in the municipality. Of these, there were 34 people employed in the primary economic sector and about 12 businesses involved in this sector. No one was employed in the secondary sector. 26 people were employed in the tertiary sector, with 10 businesses in this sector. There were 243 residents of the municipality who were employed in some capacity, of which females made up 45.3% of the workforce.

In 2008 there were a total of 40 full-time equivalent jobs. The number of jobs in the primary sector was 23, all of which were in agriculture. There were no jobs in the secondary sector. The number of jobs in the tertiary sector was 17. In the tertiary sector; 1 was in wholesale or retail sales or the repair of motor vehicles, 1 was in the information industry, 4 or 23.5% were technical professionals or scientists, 5 or 29.4% were in education.

In 2000, there were 17 workers who commuted into the municipality and 187 workers who commuted away. The municipality is a net exporter of workers, with about 11.0 workers leaving the municipality for every one entering. Of the working population, 14% used public transportation to get to work, and 56.8% used a private car.

== Religion ==
From the 2000 census, 42 or 8.9% were Roman Catholic, while 370 or 78.1% belonged to the Swiss Reformed Church. Of the rest of the population, there were 3 members of an Orthodox church (or about 0.63% of the population), and there were 40 individuals (or about 8.44% of the population) who belonged to another Christian church. There were 4 individuals who were Hindu. 31 (or about 6.54% of the population) belonged to no church, are agnostic or atheist, and 4 individuals (or about 0.84% of the population) did not answer the question.

== Education ==
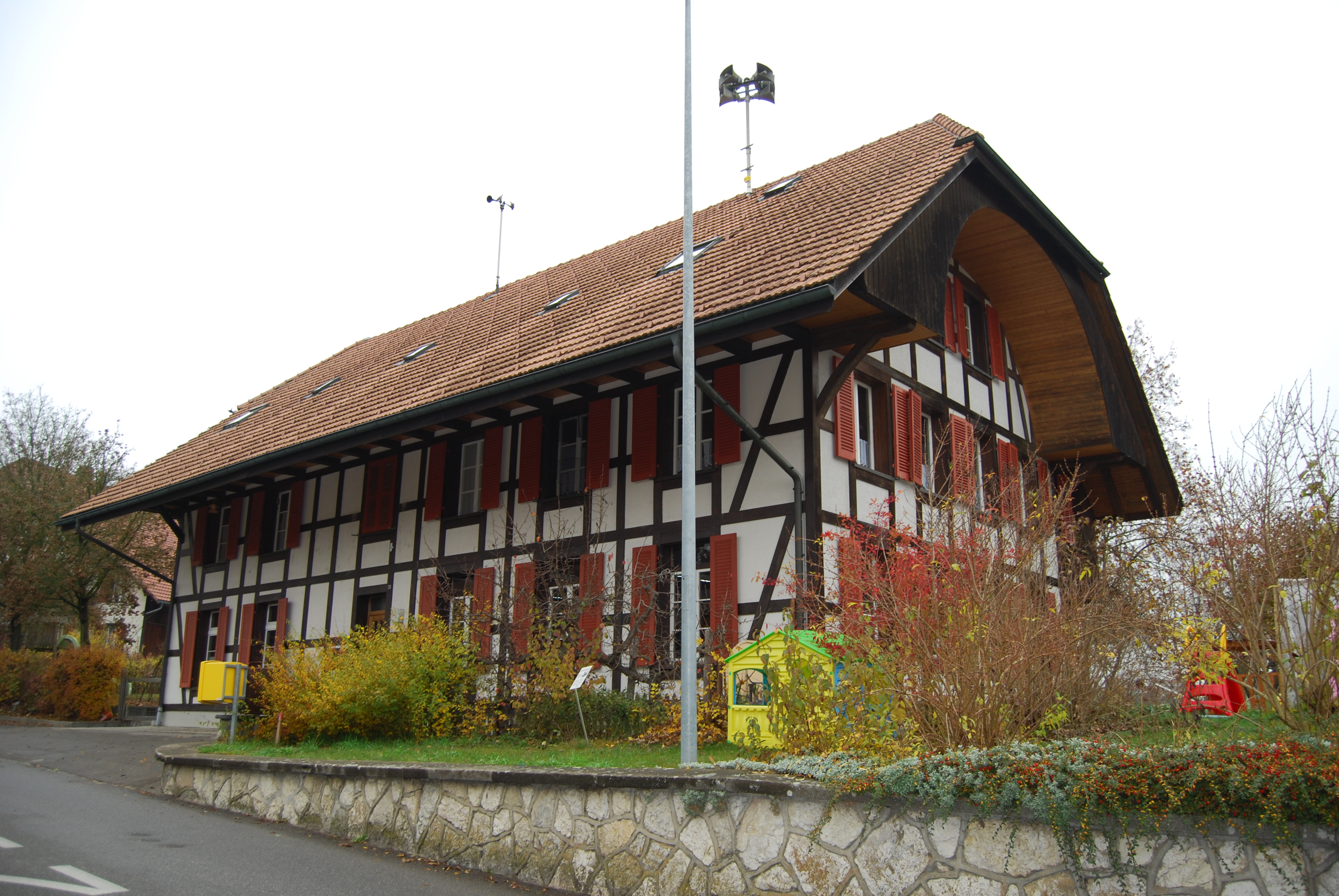
Zuzwil school building

In Zuzwil about 200 or (42.2%) of the population have completed non-mandatory upper secondary education, and 86 or (18.1%) have completed additional higher education (either university or a Fachhochschule). Of the 86 who completed tertiary schooling, 69.8% were Swiss men, 25.6% were Swiss women.

The Canton of Bern school system provides one year of non-obligatory Kindergarten, followed by six years of Primary school. This is followed by three years of obligatory lower Secondary school where the students are separated according to ability and aptitude. Following the lower Secondary students may attend additional schooling or they may enter an apprenticeship.

During the 2010–11 school year, there were a total of 73 students attending classes in Zuzwil. There was one kindergarten class with a total of 30 students in the municipality. The municipality had 2 primary classes and 31 students. Of the primary students, 6.5% were permanent or temporary residents of Switzerland (not citizens) and 9.7% have a different mother language than the classroom language. During the same year, there was one lower secondary class with a total of 12 students.

As of 2000, there were 27 students in Zuzwil who came from another municipality, while 23 residents attended schools outside the municipality.
