= List of chief librarians at State Library Victoria =

The State Library Victoria's first librarian, Augustus Tulk, was appointed in 1856. Today, the person responsible for the overall management of the state library is the Chief Librarian, who is also the library's Chief Executive Officer. Throughout the library's history, incumbents in this senior leadership role have also been known as the State Librarian of Victoria.

== Chief Librarians and CEOs ==
- 1856-1873: Augustus Henry Tulk, first librarian
- 1873-1881: Henry Sheffield
- 1881-1895: Thomas Francis Bride, LL.D.
- 1895-1896: Michael Francis Dowden, LL.B.
- 1896-1925: Edmund La Touche Armstrong, M.A., LL.B.
- 1925-1931: Robert Douglass Boys, B.A.
- 1931-1943: Ernest Roland Pitt, B.A.
- 1943-1944: Thomas Fleming Cooke, B.A.
- 1944-1945: William Charles Baud, B.A.
- 1945-1960: Colin Alexander McCallum, O.B.E., B.A.
- 1960-1965: John Andrew Feely, B.Sc.
- 1965-1967: (Acting) Thomas Arthur Kealy, B.A.
- 1967-1981: Kenneth Horn, B.A., Mus.B., Dip.N.Z.L.S.
- 1982-1985: Warren Horton, B.A.
- 1986-1989: Jane La Scala, B.SocSc.
- 1989-1993: Leah Mann, B.A., Dip.Soc.St.
- 1993: (Acting) Derek Whitehead OAM, BA (Hons), BD (Hons) MLib, GradDipLib
- 1993-1997: Helen Tait, B.A., Dip.N.Z.L.S.
- 1997: (Acting) Derek Whitehead
- 1997-2002: Frances Awcock, B.A., Dip.Lib.
- 2003-2011: Anne-Marie Schwirtlich, BA (Hons), Dip Info Management - Archives Administration
- 2011-2012: (Acting) Sue Hamilton
- 2012-2015: Sue Roberts, BA (Hons), PGDipLib, MA, CEO and State Librarian
- 2015: (Acting) Justine Hyde
- 2015-2021: Kate Torney, B. Communications, Chief Executive Officer
- 2021-2022: (Acting) Sarah Slade
- 2022-2025: Paul Duldig, BEcon (Hons), MEcon
- 2025-2026: (Acting) John Wicks
- 2026: (Interim) Alistair Mytton
- 2026: Roxanne Missingham, Director, Collections and Chief Librarian
- 2026: Vicki McDonald, Chief Executive Officer

== See also ==
- Edquist, Harriet. Building a new world: a history of the State Library of Victoria, 1853-1913. Melbourne, Vic., State Library of Victoria, 2013.
- McVilly, David. A history of the State Library of Victoria, 1853-1974. Thesis (M.A.). Clayton, Vic., Monash University, 1975.
