= Jane La Scala =

Former state librarian at State Library Victoria

Jane Annette La Scala
- Born: 12 September 1935
- Died: 23 March 2016 (aged 80)
- Occupation: Librarian
- Employer: State Library Victoria
- Known for: Being the first female state librarian at State Library Victoria
- Title: State Librarian
- Term: 1986-1989
- Predecessor: Warren Horton
- Successor: Leah Mann

Jane La Scala (September 12, 1935 - March 23, 2016) was an Australian librarian who served as the State Librarian at State Library Victoria from 1986 to 1989. She was the first woman ever to be appointed to this role.

== Career ==
Jane La Scala worked as a librarian and library administrator in a career that spanned over 30 years. Much of this time was spent in public libraries.

Her work with the Library Council of Victoria provided opportunities to be involved with the planning and development of public and government library services at both a state and national level. Her roles included policy development, providing consultancy services, building planning, developing standards and evaluation methods, membership of multiple committees, and promoting the value of libraries and information services to the community. La Scala also had a period working with fellow librarian Barrett Reid in the Free Library Service Board, and later in the Public Libraries Division."

In 1980, La Scala was funded by the State Government of Victoria to visit libraries in Scandinavia, Italy and England, so that she could study local government restructures and their effect on libraries and library services. She also had 9 years of experience working in Canadian libraries, providing a valuable international background to inform her library development roles in Australia.

In 1986, La Scala became the first woman to be appointed State Librarian in Victoria. This was a significant achievement given that the first librarian, Augustus Tulk, had been appointed in 1856, some 130 years earlier. Her appointment was officially announced in February 1986 by Race Matthews, who was then the Victorian Minister for the Arts. La Scala had been acting in the role since July 1985, when her predecessor, Warren Horton, accepted the role of Director-General of the National Library of Australia.

La Scala retired from her State Librarian role in 1989. However, she continued her association with the State Library Victoria in the role of Director Executive Services.

An article published in 1987 included La Scala's description of her career and perceptions of librarianship as a profession.

The National Library of Australia holds a biographical cuttings file on Jane La Scala that includes articles and obituaries from Australian newspapers and journals.

== Personal life ==
La Scala was married to Peter and they had two daughters. She died in 2016 at the age of 80 and is buried at Fawkner Memorial Park.

== Select publications ==
- La Scala, Jane, ‘Glorious ornament or Victoria's shame: the State Library of Victoria facing the 21st century', Australian academic and research libraries, vol 23, no 2 (June 1992): pp 78-91.
- La Scala, Jane, et al. Don’t Shoot Darling : An Exhibition of Popular Female Culture of the 1950s. Library Council of Victoria, 1985. https://search.worldcat.org/title/1356305689
- Ls Scala, Jane, et al. Review of Library Services to Print Handicapped Readers in Victoria : Report of a Working Group to the Minister for the Arts. [Library Council of Victoria?], 1985. https://search.worldcat.org/title/220729430
- La Scala, Jane. An evaluation of telephone reference services of public libraries in metropolitan Melbourne, 1972. https://search.worldcat.org/title/220048209
