= Derek Fielding =

Australian librarian and author

Fred Derek Osmond Fielding
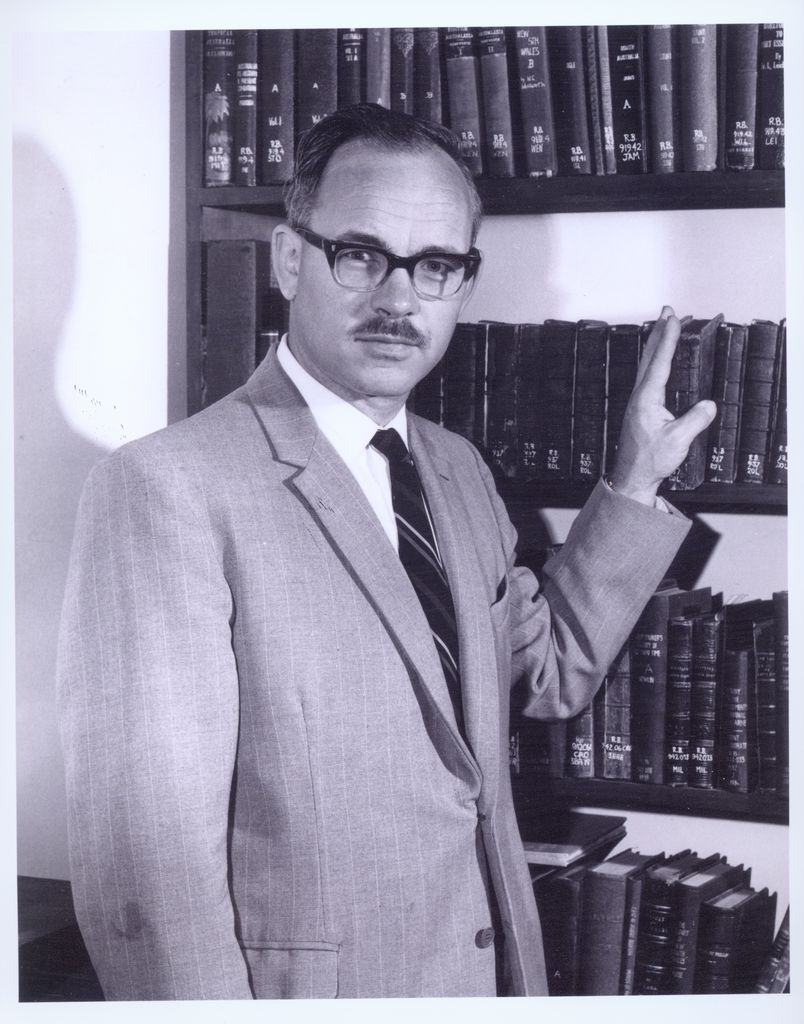
- Fielding in 1965
- Born: 14 August 1929; Belfast, Northern Ireland
- Died: 25 June 2014 (aged 84)
- Education: Trinity College, Dublin
- Awards: ALIA HCL Anderson Award Member of the Order of Australia

Fred Derek Osmond Fielding AM (14 August 1929 – 25 June 2014) was an Australian librarian and author. In 1951 Derek graduated from the Trinity College, Dublin. He was University Librarian at the University of Queensland from 1965 to 1994. In 1991, he received the HCL Anderson Award from the Australian Library and Information Association.

== Early life ==
Fred Derek Osmond Fielding, usually known as Derek Fielding, was born in Belfast, Northern Ireland in 1929. After the early deaths of his parents, he was educated at the Masonic Orphan Boys' School in Dublin from 1939 to 1947. He graduated from Trinity College, Dublin in 1951 with a M.A. in modern history and political science. He went to work for Sheffield City libraries from 1951–1957, and would marry Audrey Reynolds in 1953.

== Career ==
Fielding and his family migrated to Auckland, New Zealand in 1958 to be Deputy University Librarian at the University of Auckland. Following this appointment, they would travel to Perth, Western Australia to be Deputy University Librarian of the University of Western Australia from 1961–1965. The University of Queensland Library in Brisbane, Australia had been without a University Librarian for two years, after the resignation of Harrison Bryan. Fielding would take up the position of UQ James Forsyth University Librarian in 1965, and bring about tremendous growth in the library's collection. Under his management, the library went from 360,000 books to 1.5 million volumes. Smaller libraries were amalgamated. He oversaw the building of three new library buildings in 1974, 1976 and 1990 and the establishment of the clinical library at the Royal Brisbane Hospital. He sat on the University Senate from 1972 to 1983, and chaired a committee reporting on university organisation in 1982. He had the library collection recatalogued from 1968 to 1978 to the Library of Congress Classification system. As the university took on more students, and with the improvement in photocopying and electronic transmission of materials, Fielding became active in copyright law review. He worked with the Commonwealth Attorney-General's department and Australian Vice-Chancellor's Copyright Committee to develop guidelines for resolving the problems of copyright in an electronic age. He would publish articles in the Australian Library Journal and other ALIA papers and conferences.

Fielding was Pro-Vice Chancellor, Academic Services, at the University from 1992 to 1994. He retired in 1992 and was made Librarian Emeritus. He died at his home in 2014.

== Awards ==
In 1991 Fielding received the Australian Library and Information Association's HCL Anderson Award. In 1996 he was awarded an AM, Member of the Order of Australia.

== Interests ==
An enthusiast of Rugby Union, Fielding sat on referee appointments committees in Brisbane. He was a volunteer radio announcer and committee member of Brisbane classical radio station, 4MBS. A strong believer in civil liberties and social issues from his youth, he was committed to ensuring that the censorship of libraries, both academic and public, was discouraged. This was particularly significant during the political era in which he guided the University library, under the then Premier of Queensland, Sir Joh Bjelke-Petersen. Fielding chaired the Library Association of Australia's Freedom to Read Committee from 1969 to 1974. He was President of the Queensland Council for Civil Liberties from 1975 to 1979. His diplomatic skills enabled UQ to permit student protests on campus, including the all night sit-in in the Walter Harrison Law Library. He was also an observer for the QCCL during the 1971 Springboks Rugby Tour during apartheid protests.

== Legacy ==
Fielding was survived by his wife, three sons and ten grandchildren.

An Inaugural Derek Fielding Memorial Lecture commenced in 2015.

== Published works ==
- Fielding, F. D. O. (Fred Derek Osmond) (1968), Master of none, University of Queensland Press
