= Sue Roberts =

Sue Roberts may refer to:

- Sue Roberts (golfer)
- Sue Roberts (librarian)
- Sue Roberts (powerlifter)

== See also ==
- Susan Roberts, South African swimmer
- Sue Lloyd-Roberts, British television journalist
