= Marie-Louise Ayres =

Director-General of the National Library Australia

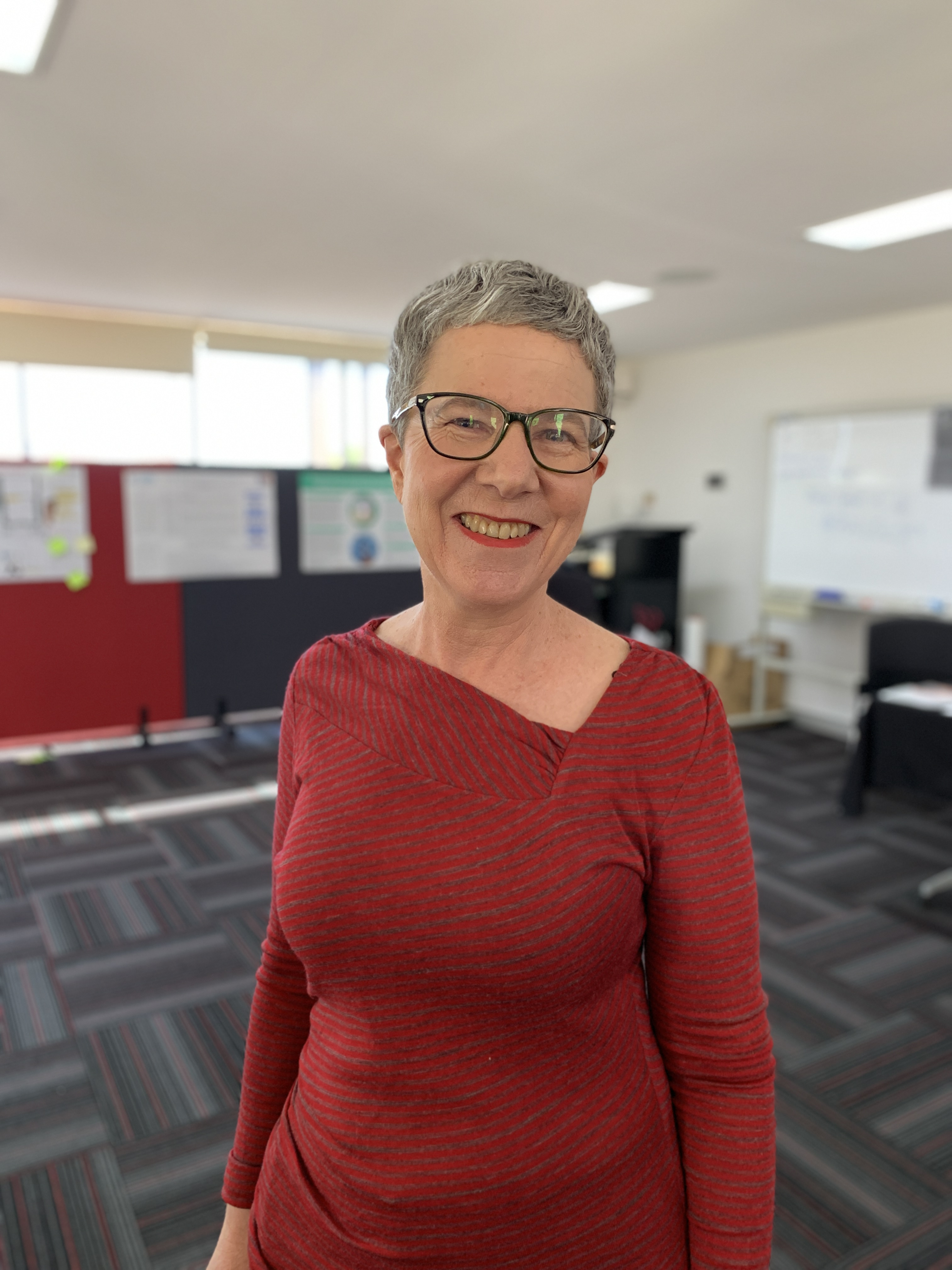
- Born: 1963; Perth, Western Australia
- Education: University of New England; Australian National University
- Organization: National Library of Australia
- Title: Director-General
- Term: 2017-2026
- Predecessor: Anne-Marie Schwirtlich
- Successor: Alison Dellit

Marie-Louise Ayres is a librarian whose work has centered on providing digital access to cultural resources throughout Australia. She was the Director-General of the National Library of Australia from March 2017 to April 2026.

== Early life and education ==
Marie-Louise Ayres was born in 1963 in Perth, Western Australia, and moved with her family to Canberra in 1967. She attended St Clare's College and Stirling College.

Ayres earned her bachelor degree from the University of New England. She received a doctorate in 1994 from the Australian National University, writing her thesis on Australian women poets Dorothy Auchterlonie Green, Rosemary Dobson, Dorothy Hewett, and J. S. Harry. She later wrote Dobson's obituary in 2012, and her biographical entry in a book of Australian writers.

== Library career ==
In 1994 she became the curator of the Australian Defence Force Academy's collection of Australian literary manuscripts. Ayres worked there for eight years; her time there included the development of AustLit, a clearinghouse for information about Australia's literary and print-culture history.

Ayres began working at the National Library of Australia in 2002 as a project manager for Music Australia, a discovery service for access to music resources. She became curator of the library's manuscript division in 2006 and became head of the resource sharing division in 2011. Her position as the Assistant Director-General included managing Trove, a search engine which aggregates resources from cultural institutions across Australia.

In March 2017 Ayres succeeded Anne-Marie Schwirtlich as Director-General of the National Library of Australia, being appointed for a five-year term.

Her work continues to focus on providing access to the cultural history of Australia and addressing the challenges of preserving born-digital content.

Believing in the importance of the legal deposit system as a way to capture the country's identity, Ayres has presided over the building phase and launch of NED, the National edeposit service whereby publishers submit their digital publications directly via a website to fulfill their legal deposit obligations. The nationwide service went live on 30 May 2019, and was formally launched by the Arts Minister Paul Fletcher, on 16 August 2019.

In 2025, Ayres announced her pending retirement, confirmed as 8 April 2026. Her successor, Alison Dellit, was announced in March 2026.

=== Awards and recognition ===
In 2020, Ayres was elected as an Honorary Fellow of the Australian Academy of the Humanities. This was in recognition of her significant contribution to the humanities, the arts and Australian cultural life.

== Bibliography ==
- Ayres, Marie-Louise (1994). 'Me is not a stable reality' : negotiations of identity in the poetry of Dorothy Auchterlonie, Rosemary Dobson, Dorothy Hewett and J.S. Harry. ANU thesis.
- Ayres, Marie-Louise (9 June 1994). "Women poets of Canberra". The Canberra Times. pp. 8, 11.
- Ayres, Marie-Louise (June 2011). "A picture asks a thousand questions". The National Library Magazine. 3 (2): 8–11.
