= Library acquisitions =

Library acquisitions is the department of a library responsible for the selection and purchase of materials or resources. The department may select vendors, negotiate consortium pricing, arrange for standing orders, and select individual titles or resources.

Libraries, both physical and digital, usually have four common broad goals that help dictate these responsibilities. These goals are significant to libraries in order to maintain the basic principle of access.

1. To acquire material as quickly as possible
2. To maintain a high level of accuracy in all work procedures
3. To keep work processes simple in order to achieve the lowest possible unit cost
4. To develop close, friendly working relationships with other library units and vendors

There are generally five steps taken in order to acquire material for a library collection, whether physical or digital.

1. Request processing
2. Verification
3. Ordering
4. Reporting (fiscal management)
5. Receiving orders

There are eight types of acquisition methods followed by libraries:

1. Firm orders – Orders that are determined by name specifically. For example, a specific book, textbook, or journal that the library wants.
2. Standing orders – Open orders for all titles that fit a particular category or subject. For example, these are usually developed for serials and the library knows that it will want anything published in that particular series. A benefit to this style of ordering is that it is automatic—the acquisitions department does not have to order the next in series.
3. Approval plans – Similar to standing orders except they cover quite a few topic areas, are sent from the vendor, and the library is only charged for the specific titles that they accept into their collection. Under these circumstances the library is free to return anything it does not wish to add to its collections. A benefit to this style of ordering is that the acquisitions department can sometimes make better decisions with the materials in hand versus an order form.
4. Blanket orders – Largely a combination of both a firm order and an approval plan. Blanket orders are the library making a commitment to purchase all of something. For example, a library makes a contract with a certain publisher or vendor and will purchase everything that this publisher or vendor has available in regards to a topic. A benefit to this style of ordering is an automatic acquisition of materials for a particular field, which can be especially beneficial to specialized or academic libraries.
5. Subscriptions – Generally utilized for journals, newspapers, or other serials that a library will acquire. Like standing and blanket orders, a library only has to develop a contract once with a vendor or publisher and the items are automatically delivered when printed. Often, subscriptions are for a specific length of time and must be renewed at the end of the contract.
6. Leases – Contracts that allow access to particular resources for a period of time. Leases are most commonly utilized with electronic resources such as databases, journals, and web-based materials. The library is paying for access to the material versus paying for ownership of the material.
7. Gifts – In some cases libraries may allow gifts that people give to the library. It is the job of the acquisitions department to determine whether or not the gift will be kept and incorporated into the library’s collection. This method is typically used by large academic institutions, and the persons giving the gifts are mostly alumni of that institution. A library's collection development policy usually states whether the library accepts gifts.
8. Exchanges – Exchanges can be broken into two subcategories: exchange of unwanted duplicate/gift materials AND the exchange of new materials between libraries. Again, the institutions that usually have a process for this type of acquiring are larger academic or research libraries. This is also a process of consortia.

The American Library Association offers Fundamentals of Acquisitions courses throughout the year to provide basic procedures for library acquisitions concepts commonly used for all library formats.

== See also ==
- Digital Collections Selection Criteria
