= Jan Fullerton =

Australian library director

Jan Fullerton AO FAHA
- Citizenship: Australian
- Education: University of Queensland
- Occupation: Librarian
- Years active: 1967–2010
- Employer: National Library of Australia
- Organization: National Library of Australia
- Known for: Picture Australia newspaper digitisation
- Title: Director-General
- Term: 1999-2010
- Predecessor: Warren Horton
- Successor: Anne-Marie Schwirtlich
- Awards: HCL Anderson Award (2010)

Janice Lillian Fullerton AO FAHA is an Australian librarian. She was the first woman to be appointed Director General of the National Library of Australia (NLA) and first internal appointment to the role.

== Education and career ==
Fullerton was born in Queensland and grew up on the Sunshine Coast at Beerwah. Her secondary schooling was at Nambour High School. She graduated from the University of Queensland in 1966 with a Bachelor of Arts and completed a Graduate Diploma in Librarianship at the University of New South Wales in 1967. She began work in the NLA's film and sound archives department in the following year.

In August 1999, the Minister for the Arts, Peter McGauran, announced Fullerton's appointment as Director General of the NLA and Senator Jocelyn Newman congratulated her as the first woman to head the library since its inception in 1901, following an international search. During her time in the role, Fullerton led efforts to make the NLA's collections more accessible. This included digitising newspapers and launching the Picture Australia resource. She also reported on the NLA's disaster preparedness.

Fullerton announced her intention to retire from the Director General role in June 2010. She subsequently donated her correspondence, photographs and other written materials to the NLA.

== Awards and recognition ==
In 2001 Fullerton was inducted onto the Victorian Honour Roll of Women. She was appointed an Officer of the Order of Australia (AO) in the 2005 Queen's Birthday Honours for "service to librarianship through the facilitation of wider community access to the collections of the National Library of Australia, the preservation of cultural heritage in digital forms, and collaboration with other collecting agencies nationally and internationally". In 2006 she was made an Honorary Fellow of the Australian Academy of the Humanities, acknowledging her "outstanding contribution to the role of libraries both nationally and internationally ... over the past decade, Ms Fullerton has taken the Library into the digital age in a collaborative manner that has attracted much praise". The University of Queensland recognised her contribution to librarianship by awarding her a Doctor of Letters honoris causa in 2010. In the same year the Australian Library and Information Association awarded her the HCL Anderson Award for her "outstanding leadership to the Australian library sector".
