= Harold Leslie White =

Australian librarian

- Born: 14 June 1905
- Died: 31 August 1992 (aged 87)
- Occupation: Librarian
- Organization: National Library of Australia
- Title: Director-General
- Term: 1947-1970
- Predecessor: Kenneth Binns (librarian)
- Successor: Allan Percy Fleming

Sir Harold Leslie White CBE (14 June 1905 – 31 August 1992) was the Parliamentary Librarian of Australia from 1947 to 1960, and National Librarian from 1960 until his retirement in 1970.

== Career ==
White joined the staff of the Commonwealth Parliamentary Library when he was 18 years old in 1923 at 18. Four years later he became deputy librarian and went on to become Parliamentary Librarian in 1947, while simultaneously holding the title of National Librarian.

=== National Library ===
As Parliamentary Librarian and later National Librarian, he was known for his relentless advocacy of a separate home for the National Library of Australia, within the Parliamentary Triangle, Canberra. When Sir Robert Menzies retired as Prime Minister in 1966, he remarked that he "jolly well had to give Harold White the National Library to shut him up".

== Honours ==
White was appointed a Commander of the Order of the British Empire (CBE) in 1962, and knighted in the New Year's Honours of 1970.

In 1983 the Library Association of Australia gave him an H.C.L. Anderson Award (awarded for outstanding service to the library profession).

== Family ==
White was born in Numurkah, Victoria and educated at Invergordon Primary School and Wesley College, Melbourne.

He was the father of four children:

- David Ogilvie White, Professor of Microbiology at the University of Melbourne (1967–94)
- John White, formerly chief executive of the NSW Farmers' Association (c.1935–2006)
- Judith Robinson-Valéry (1933–2010), foundation professor of French and the head of the school of western European languages at the University of NSW and later the director of research at the Centre National de Recherche Scientifique in Paris
- Katharine Ogilvie West (c.1938–2023), author and former visiting scholar in communication and public policy, University of Canberra.

== Works ==
- Canberra: A Nation’s Capital (1954)
- The Australian Capital Territory as a region (1955)
- Canberra: A Centre of Learning (1955)
- The Development of the Commonwealth Archives Programme (1957)
