= Sang Ye =

- 桑晔
- Born: 1955 (age 70–71); Beijing
- Writing career
- Genre: Oral history
- Notable works: Chinese Lives, China Candid

Sang Ye (born 1955) is the pen name of Shen Dajun, a Chinese journalist, oral historian, and collector. He is the author of two oral histories, Chinese Lives: An Oral History of Contemporary China (co-authored with the novelist Zhang Xinxin), and China Candid: The People on the People's Republic. Originally trained as an electrical engineer, following a short course at Beijing Normal University in 1978 he began working as a freelance journalist. Described as a "remarkably gifted interviewer" with a "wholly unexpected, free-and-easy style" by Studs Terkel, Sang Ye has been praised for providing a unique perspective on China in the reform and opening up era, "[bringing] to light the way people make sense of the world through telling themselves stories about their personal journeys."

In 1990, his personal archive of monographs, posters, recordings and newspapers from the Cultural Revolution was purchased by the National Library of Australia.

== Early life ==
Sang Ye
- Traditional Chinese: 桑曄
- Simplified Chinese: 桑晔
Transcriptions
Standard Mandarin
- Hanyu Pinyin: Sāng Yè

Sang Ye's paternal grandfather was originally from Zhejiang province, eventually coming to own a curios shop in Beijing. His father, who studied civil law, was an early member of the Chinese Communist Party. Sang Ye's maternal grandfather was a lawyer who worked for the Japanese occupation in Manchuria. After graduating from St. Joan’s Girls College, a French Catholic school founded by the Daughters of Charity, his mother became a physical education teacher. Sang Ye's parents divorced in 1971, an event which Nicholas Jose has argued provided a formative experience of "the gulf between noble words and shabby conduct, and the misery caused by double standards and hypocrisy in Chinese society."

== Works ==
- Chinese Lives: An Oral History of Contemporary China (co-authored with Zhang Xinxin), originally published in Chinese as Beijing People《北京人 (一百个中国人的自述)》by Shanghai Art and Literature Publishing House 上海文艺出版社 in 1986. Translated in into English by W.J.F. Jenner and Delia Davin and published in the US by Pantheon Books in 1987.
- China Candid:The People on the People's Republic, originally published in Chinese as 《1949, 1989, 1999》by Oxford University Press in Hong Kong. Translated into English by Geremie Barmé and Miriam Lang and published in the US by the University of California Press in 2006.
- The Finish Line: A Long March by Bicycle through China and Australia, with Nicholas Jose and Sue Trevaskes, published by University of Queensland Press, 1994.
- The Year the Dragon Came, co-edited with Linda Jaivin, published by University of Queensland Press, 1996.

== Personal life ==
Since the late 1980s, Sang Ye has been married to the Australian scholar of Chinese criminal justice, governance and law Susan Trevaskes. Trevaskes and Sang Ye met in 1987, during a tour of Australia on the invitation of the Australia–China Council and the Literature Board of the Australia Council. After returning briefly to live in Beijing, following the events of June 4 1989, Sang Ye was evacuated to Australia with his family, eventually settling in Brisbane.
