= Allan Percy Fleming =

Australian public servant and journalist (1912–2001)

Allan Fleming CBE

Director-General of National Library of Australia
- In office 1970-1974
- Preceded by: Harold Leslie White
- Succeeded by: George Chandler (librarian)

Personal details
- Born: Allan Percy Fleming; 5 March 1912 Melbourne, Victoria, Australia
- Died: 18 January 2001 (aged 88) Melbourne
- Education: University of Melbourne
- Occupation: Public servant, journalist

Allan Percy Fleming CBE (5 March 1912 – 18 January 2001) was a senior Australian public servant and journalist, best known for his time as National Librarian in the 1970s.

== Biography ==
=== Early life ===
Allan Fleming was born on 5 March 1912 in Melbourne, Victoria, Australia. He was educated at Lee Street State school in North Carlton, Scotch College and Melbourne University.

His first career was in journalism, first at the Melbourne Argus and later at the Brisbane Courier Mail.

=== World War II service ===
At the outbreak of World War II in 1939, Fleming enlisted in the Australian Imperial Force. He saw service in North Africa, Greece, New Guinea and the South-West Pacific, rising to the rank of Lieutenant-Colonel. After the war, he returned to journalism before joining the public sector.

=== Professional career ===
In 1968 Fleming was appointed Parliamentary Librarian. He became National Librarian in 1970, heading the National Library of Australia. In 1972 he went on a 10-week world tour studying libraries in Japan, Sweden, France, Belgium, the United States, the United Kingdom and Canada. Retiring in 1973, Fleming told media that he intended to write a book and spend time traveling in Europe.

=== later years ===
In 1976, returning from retirement, Fleming was appointed to head the Government Agency for Security of VIPs, responsible for coordinating security arrangements for the protection of visiting heads of state and other VIPs.

Fleming died on 18 January 2001.

== Awards ==
Fleming was awarded as an Officer of the Order of the British Empire for distinguished military service in the South West Pacific. He was appointed a Commander of the Order of the British Empire in 1978, in recognition of his work in the Australian Public Service.

Government offices
Preceded by Harold Leslie White	National Librarian; 1970 – 1974	Succeeded by George Chandler
