= Frances Awcock =

Former chief librarian at State Library Victoria

Frances Awcock AM
- Born: Frances Helen Hill; 1940 (age 85–86); Broken Hill
- Education: University of Melbourne; Royal Melbourne Institute of Technology
- Occupation: Librarian
- Organization: State Library Victoria
- Known for: Former State librarian at the State Library of South Australia (1991-1997) and Chief librarian and CEO at State Library Victoria (1997-2002)
- Predecessor: Derek Whitehead
- Successor: Anne-Marie Schwirtlich

Frances Awcock AM, is an Australian librarian who was the Chief Librarian and CEO of the State Library Victoria from 1997 to 2002. In 2004, she was appointed a Member of the Order of Australia (AM).

== Early life and education ==
Frances Helen Hill was born in Broken Hill, NSW, in 1940. She grew up in the area and attended boarding school in NSW before moving to Melbourne. Her father, George Hills, was a mining engineer.

She initially studied arts at the University of Melbourne and later continued her education at RMIT.

== Career ==
Awcock's early jobs included working at the Australian Science Education Project and at Toorak Teachers College.

She later worked for five years as the Director of Technical Services at the State Library of Victoria (1983-1988), followed by two years as the Executive Director of the National Book Council. She was then appointed as the Director of the State Library of South Australia, a role she held for six years. She was the first female state librarian to be appointed in South Australia.

Awcock then returned to the State Library of Victoria, where she served as Chief Librarian and Chief Executive Officer from 1997 to 2002. During this time, Awcock was responsible for overseeing a significant $200 million restoration and redevelopment program at the library. She retired at the end of 2002.

During her career, Awcock also worked as a book review presenter on ABC Radio Melbourne 774.

A collection of Awcock's papers is held by State Library Victoria.

== Awards ==
Awcock was appointed as a Member of the Order of Australia in 2004, "for service to librarianship and to the community, particularly through redevelopment projects for the state libraries of Victoria and South Australia, the application of new technology and information systems, and the promotion of library and information services."

== Personal life ==
Awcock was married for 10 years to an Anglican priest, with whom she had three children. This marriage ended in the 1970s after he became interested in yoga and joined a sect, known as the Family, which was run by Anne Hamilton-Byrne. He travelled to England with the sect, leaving Awcock in Melbourne with three young children.

Her second marriage was to fellow librarian, Chris Awcock. He also had three children, and the children in the two families grew up together. After her retirement, Awcock became a civil marriage celebrant. She was also a trustee of the Helen Macpherson Smith Trust from 2007 to 2016. The Frances Awcock Mentoring Medal was named in her honour and has been awarded to rural young people by YouThrive Victoria.

== Select publications ==
- Awcock, Frances. “Will Alma, Master Magician.” The La Trobe Journal, no. 74 (2004): 15.
- Awcock, Frances H. "Transforming centres of excellence: the State Library of Victoria's challenge." Library Review 50, no. 7-8 (2001): 355-365. https://doi.org/10.1108/EUM0000000006081
- Awcock, Frances H, and Peter Dungey. “Buildings for the New Millenium: A Study Tour of Recent Library Buildings.” LASIE: Library Automated Systems Information Exchange 28, no. 3 (1997): 34–41.
- Awcock, Frances H. “Reasserting the Public Library’s Role in Influencing Culture and Citizenship.” Australasian Public Libraries and Information Services 9, no. 3/4 (1996): 119–27.
- Awcock, Frances H. “Technology and Theological Libraries.” ANZTLA EJournal, no. 3 (1987): 4–16. https://doi.org/10.31046/anztla.v0i3.735.
