= Zhang Xinxin (writer) =

Chinese writer

- 张辛欣
- Born: October 4, 1953 (age 72); Nanjing, Jiangsu, China
- Education: Central Academy of Drama
- Occupation: Writer
- Writing career
- Language: Chinese
- Period: 1978–present
- Genres: Short stories, screenplays, non-fiction
- Notable works: "On the Same Horizon", Chinese Lives

Zhang Xinxin (simplified Chinese: 张辛欣; traditional Chinese: 張辛欣; pinyin: Zhāng Xīnxīn; born October 4, 1953) is a Chinese writer and director. Outside of China, she is best known for her work Chinese Lives (1986), co-authored with the journalist and oral historian Sang Ye. She has also written short stories, screenplays, and autobiographical works.

== Background ==
Zhang was born in Nanjing, Jiangsu, on October 4, 1953. She was raised in Beijing. As a result of her father's military position and the fact that he was a writer, Zhang had access to a wide variety of books in her childhood and spent much of her time reading. During the Down to the Countryside Movement, she worked as a sent-down youth in Heilongjiang province in northeast China. She enlisted in the People's Liberation Army (PLA) in Hunan province in central China. After an illness and while still in the PLA, she was sent as a nurse to Xishuangbanna. In 1971, she left the PLA and continued to work as a nurse in Beijing until 1976.

She was admitted to Central Academy of Drama in 1979 to study theatre directing. She finished her studies in 1984, but was denied her diploma for a year. She worked as a director at Beijing People's Art Theatre between 1985 and 1988. From 1988 to 1990, she studied at Cornell University and the University of Georgia, and has remained in the United States since.

== Works ==
She began to publish her works in 1978. Her first publication, in the literary journal Beijing Literature, was a short story titled "In the Quiet Ward." During her studies at the Central Academy of Drama, she began writing novellas, the first of which was a 1981 semi-autobiographical work titled "On the Same Horizon" (在同一地平线上). This novella was an initial success and garnered her literary acclaim, though it was later criticized in the context of the Anti-Spiritual Pollution Campaign, which resulted in consequences for her academic and literary career.

After the campaign, Zhang started creating a wider variety of works, including Orchid Mania (疯狂的君子兰), a 1983 detective fiction short story, and Chinese Lives, a 1986 collection of interviews with a variety of ordinary Chinese people. The latter was co-authored with Sang Ye. She has also written plays such as We, You (我们，你们) and an autobiography, Me (我Me), in two volumes. She also wrote and illustrated a graphic novel, Pai Hua Zi and the Clever Girl (拍花子和俏女孩), which she self-published in 2012. More recently, she has written about her experience during the COVID-19 pandemic.

== Style ==
Zhang's early works deal with themes such as the effects of gender roles and expectations, the duality of womanhood, and the search for an "authentic self." However, after being the subject of political persecution in the 1980s, she shifted from her avant-garde style to a less politically controversial one. Having read a variety of literature throughout her life, Zhang also incorporates Western concepts into her writing. Overall, her works have covered a wide range of genres, from short stories to journalistic non-fiction to screenplays, and a variety of topics reflecting her experiences.

== Fiction ==
=== Autobiographical fiction ===
- 《我 Me》 (Me, 2 volumes, 2011)
  - English excerpt "After the Inferno", 2017.

=== Novels ===
- 《IT84》(IT84, 2018)
  - English: excerpts translated by Helen Wang, 2019.

=== Novellas ===
- 《疯狂的君子兰》(Orchid Mania, 1983)
  - English: Mad about Orchids, translated by Helen Wang, 2011.
- 《我们这个年纪的梦》 (The Dreams of Our Generation, 1985)
- 《封．片．联》 (Postcard and Bandits, 1986)
- 《IT84》(IT84, 2015)

=== Short stories ===
- "In the Quiet Ward" (1978)
- 《我在哪兒錯過了你?》("Where Did I Miss You?," 1979)
- 《在同一个地平线上》("On the Same Horizon," 1981)
- 《张辛欣小说选》 (The Collected Stories of Zhang Xinxin, 1985)
- 《这次你演哪一半? 》 ("Which half will you play this time – husband or wife?," 1988)
- 《龙的食谱》 ("A Recipe for Dragons," 2011)
  - English: "Dragonworld" in The Guardian, 14 April 2012, and Read Paper Republic, Afterlives 2, 3 Nov 2016.

=== Graphic novel ===
- 《拍花子和俏女孩》(Pai Hua Zi and the Clever Girl, 2012)

== Non-fiction ==
- 《在路上》 (On the Road, 1986)
- 《北京人 (一百个中国人的自述)》(Peking Man: One Hundred Chinese Self Portraits, 1986) - co-authored with Sang Ye
- 《天狱：偷渡美国》(Hell in Heaven: Smuggling to America, 1994)
- 《我知道的美国之音》(Me and the VOA: A Collection of Commentaries, 2000)
- 《独步东西 : 一个旅美作家的网上创作》 (Lonely Drifter: The Wanderer Between the East and the West - My Journey on The Web, 2000)
- 《流浪世界的方式》 (Style of Wandering the World: Short Essay Collection, 2002)
- 《闲说外国人》 (Chatting About Foreigners, 2002)
- 《我的好莱坞大学》(Dark Paradise: My Observations of Hollywood, 2003)
- 《我在美国的自隔离日记》(My Self-Isolation Diaries) - Jintian toutiao, 24 April 2020.
  - English Excerpt: A Virus Named Totalitarianism (Humans in Pandemic, 21 May 2020)

== Film, TV, radio ==
- "棋王" (The Chessmaster, screenplay of Ah Cheng's novel)
- "我们，你们" (We, You, screenplay and directing, Capital Sports Stadium)
- "运河人" (People of the Grand Canal, presenting on CCTV)
- "普通人" (Ordinary People, presenting on Central People's Broadcasting)
- "封。片。联" (Postcard and Bandits, novella and radio series)
- "珍邮谜案" (The Stamp Mystery, TV mini-series, screenplay and directing)
- "作家手记"(Diary of an Author, commentary on Voice of America)
