= University of Queensland Library =

Academic library of the University of Queensland

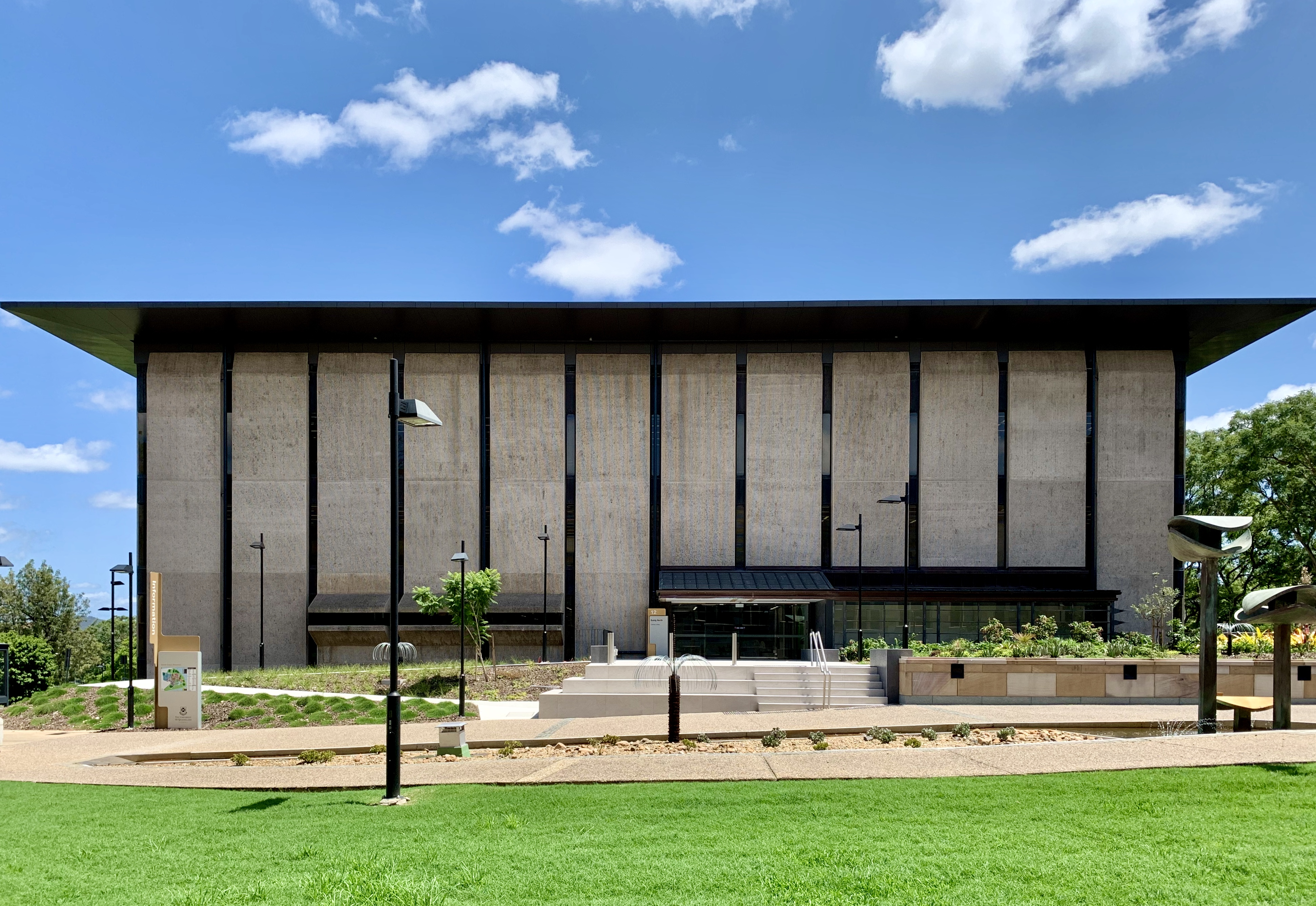
- Central Library, University of Queensland
- 27.4960°S 153.0148°E
- Location: Australia
- Type: Academic library
- Established: 1910

Collection
- Size: 2.36 million books

Other information
- Budget: A$43,474,125 (2014)
- Director: University Librarian
- Employees: 235
- Parent organisation: University of Queensland
- Website: www.library.uq.edu.au

The University of Queensland Library (UQ Library, founded in 1910) provides library access to students of the University of Queensland in Brisbane. It developed from a small provincial university library into a major research library. It was first housed in the Old Government House building of George Street from 1911 to 1923. From 1923 to 1948, it was housed in the Art Block of the Central Technical College in George Street, next to the university. In late 1948, the library moved to the new St Lucia campus, residing in the Duhig Building. By 1954, it had already exceeded its capacity.

For decades the library suffered from neglect. Some of this was due to the lack of a formal librarian, and other problems were due to the lack of funds during the early decades of the university's history. The early building in George Street was riddled with white ants and borers, and later lack of space. After the move to St Lucia, the Duhig building was expanded in 1964, and smaller libraries sprang up to support Department needs. In 1974, the Duhig building had exceeded its capacity and hence the Central Library was built, under the direction of then University Librarian, Derek Fielding. A four-storey Biological Sciences Library building, to accommodate the growing science collections, was built in 1976. The same year, the Architecture and Music libraries were amalgamated into one place, the Zelman Cowen building, named for the Vice-Chancellor and soon-to-be Governor-General of Australia, Sir Zelman Cowen.

The Herston Medical Library was opened in 1984 at the Royal Brisbane Hospital, an amalgamation of many smaller medical libraries. The Physical Sciences and Engineering Library was opened in 1990, and the Law Library gained another floor that same year.

After the closure of the Thatcher Memorial Library and Ringrose Libraries in 1993, which specialised in distance education resources, the university acquired the library of the Queensland Agricultural College at Gatton, as part of its amalgamation with the university in 1989.

Today the UQ Library is the University of Queensland's network of libraries, encompassing thirteen distinct branches.

== Branches ==
The library has numerous branches reflecting the many locations and disciplines of the university, including:

- Architecture and Music Library
- Biological Sciences Library
- Central Library
- Dorothy Hill Engineering and Sciences Library, including:
  - C.S. Davis Mathematics Library
  - Dorothy Hill Geology Library
  - Thomas Parnell Memorial Physics Library
- Duhig Tower, including the FW Robinson Reading Room, providing access to:
  - Fryer Library
  - University of Queensland Archives
- Gatton Library (JK Murray Library)
- Herston Health Sciences Library
- Rural Clinical School Libraries (RCS)
- Pharmacy Australia Centre of Excellence Library (PACE)
- Walter Harrison Law Library

== University Librarians ==
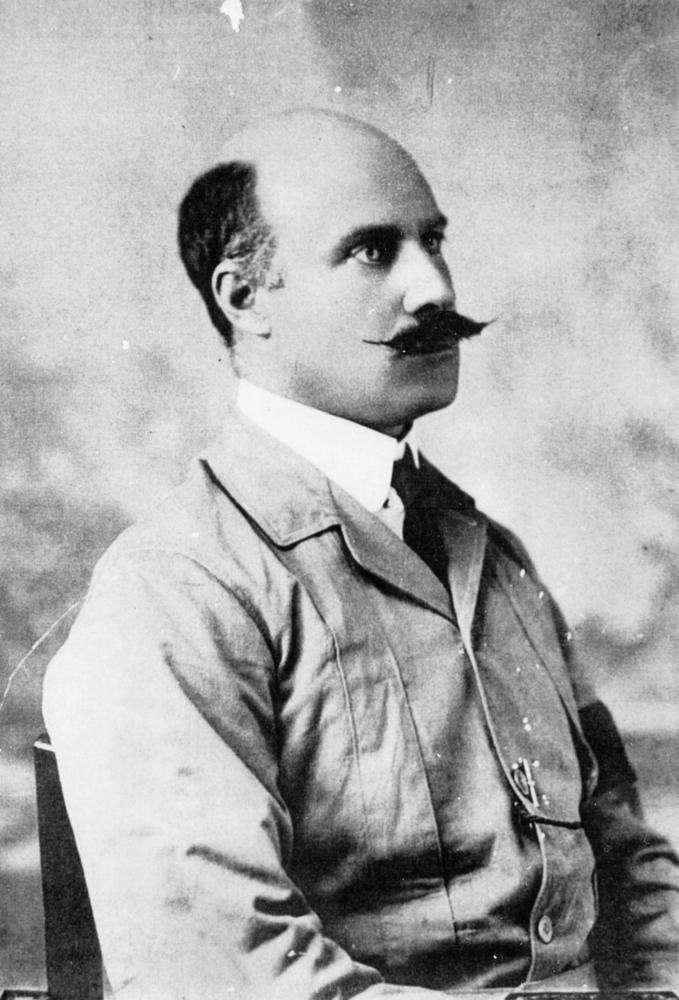
Professor Francis William Sutton Cumbrae-Stewart

Past heads of the library include:

- 1910–1925 Honorary Librarian - F.W.S. Cumbrae Stewart
  - Assistant Librarian R.J. Cholmeley.
  - 1918–1958 Assistant- Ellen "Nellie" McIver
- 1934–1939 Part time librarian - A. C. V. Melbourne
- 1939–1946 James Forsyth Librarian - Richard Pennington
- 1946–1948 James Forsyth Librarian - Norman Gould
- 1950–1962 University Librarian - Harrison Bryan.
  - 1956–1965 First Deputy University Librarian-Barry Scott
  - 1959–1997-first Reference Librarian appointed-Spencer Routh.
- 1963–1964 Acting University Librarian - Barry Scott
- 1965–1992 University Librarian - Derek Fielding
  - 1966–1972 Deputy University Librarian Sid Page
  - 1973–1977 John Cummings
  - 1978–1981 Eric Wainwright
  - 1982–1985 Earle Gow
  - 1986–1998 Deputy University Librarian George Eichinski
- 1992–1993 Acting University Librarian - George Eichinski
- 1993–2005 University Librarian - Janine Schmidt
- 2005–2006 Acting University Librarian - Mary Lyons
- 2006–2011 University Librarian - Keith Webster
- 2011–2012 Acting University Librarian - Mary Lyons
- 2012–2018 University Librarian - Robert Gerrity
- 2018–2019 Acting University Librarian - Annette McNicol
- 2019–2025 University Librarian - Dr Caroline Williams
- 2025 – TBD Acting University Librarian - click citation here:
