= Pandora archive =

Australian national web archive

Coordinates: 35°17′47.49″S 149°07′46.02″E

PANDORA
- Website type: Web archive
- Owner: National Library of Australia
- Creators: National Library of Australia and partner organisations
- Website: Official website
- Commercial: No
- Launched: October 1996; 29 years ago
- Written in: PANDORA Digital Archiving System (PANDAS) v.3

PANDORA, or Pandora, is a national web archive for the preservation of Australia's online publications. Established by the National Library of Australia in 1996, it has been built in collaboration with Australian state libraries and cultural collecting organisations, including the Australian Institute of Aboriginal and Torres Strait Islander Studies, the Australian War Memorial, and the National Film and Sound Archive. It is now one of three components of the Australian Web Archive.

The name, PANDORA, is a backronym which describes its purpose: Preserving and Accessing Networked Documentary Resources of Australia.

== History ==
The National Library of Australia (NLA) began selecting suitable online publications at the beginning of 1996, after recognising "the need to preserve Australia's documentary heritage in online formats as well as in the traditional formats of its existing collections". After investigating the landscape of "Australian electronic publications" between 1993 and 1996, staff (initially four) were committed to the PANDORA program. Following a six-month period of testing and experimentation, the NLA committed to collecting materials in online formats. A system to store, manage and provide access to these online publications was built by the NLA, which includes PANDORA, a set of policies and procedures and a technical infrastructure.

The first two titles were downloaded in October 1996. By June 1997 the archive contained 31 titles. With the sheer volume of content that needed archiving, it was essential to collaborate with other organisations, and in 1998 the State Library of Victoria came on board. By 2000, 600 titles had been archived, at which time the website was redesigned. The new site added subject-level access to titles and included documents relating to the PANDORA project.

In August 1998 the State Library of Victoria became a participant in adding content. In 2000, ScreenSound Australia (now National Film and Sound Archive) joined as a collaborating partner. By 2003, all of the mainland State libraries, the Northern Territory Library, the National Film and Sound Archive, the Australian War Memorial and the Australian Institute of Aboriginal and Torres Strait Islander Studies (AIATSIS) had become participants. The State Library of Tasmania has not participated in PANDORA, at the time of inception running its own web archiving project called Our Digital Island.

== Description ==
=== Selection criteria ===
The PANDORA archive collects certain Australian web resources according to a specified selection policy, preserves them, and makes them available for viewing. Content must be about Australia, and is selected based on its cultural significance and research value; and must be "on a subject of social, political, cultural, religious, scientific or economic significance and relevance to Australia and be written by an Australian author; or be written by an Australian recognised authority and constitute a contribution to international knowledge".

The provision for legal deposit of digital format publications was added to the Australian Copyright Act 1968 in 2016 so the National Library of Australia may copy Australian websites without acquiring permission. They do notify publishers before copying a website to the PANDORA archive, and may request publisher assistance if required.

Selection also gives priority to six categories of publication:

- Commonwealth and ACT government publications
- Publications of tertiary education institutions
- Conference proceedings
- E-journals
- Titles referred by indexing and abstracting agencies
- Topical sites in nominated subject areas, collected on a rolling three-year basis, and those documenting issues of current social or political interest (such as elections, Sydney Olympics)

As time and staff resources permit, high quality sites outside these categories may be included, within certain guidelines, for instance, "Personal sites will usually only be selected if they provide information of outstanding research value unavailable elsewhere or if they are of exceptional quality or particular interest".

=== Software ===
The archival management system called PANDAS (PANDORA Digital Archiving System) is used to add a title into PANDORA. This was developed and is maintained by the National Library of Australia. The latest version is PANDAS 3, which was deployed in mid-2007.

== Current and future status ==
In March 2019 it became part of larger the Australian Web Archive, which comprises the PANDORA Archive, the Australian Government Web Archive (AGWA) and the National Library's ".au" domain collections, using a single interface in Trove which is publicly available.

As of 31 October 2023, there were 79,827 archived titles, using 110.11 TB of data.

== See also ==
- Australian Bibliographic Network
- Internet Archive
- National Digital Library Program (NDLP), US digital library created by scanning the resources of the Library of Congress
- National Digital Information Infrastructure and Preservation Program (NDIIPP) - US
- National edeposit (NED) - Australia
- Trove
