= Harrison Bryan =

Australian librarian (1923–2008)

Harrison Bryan AO
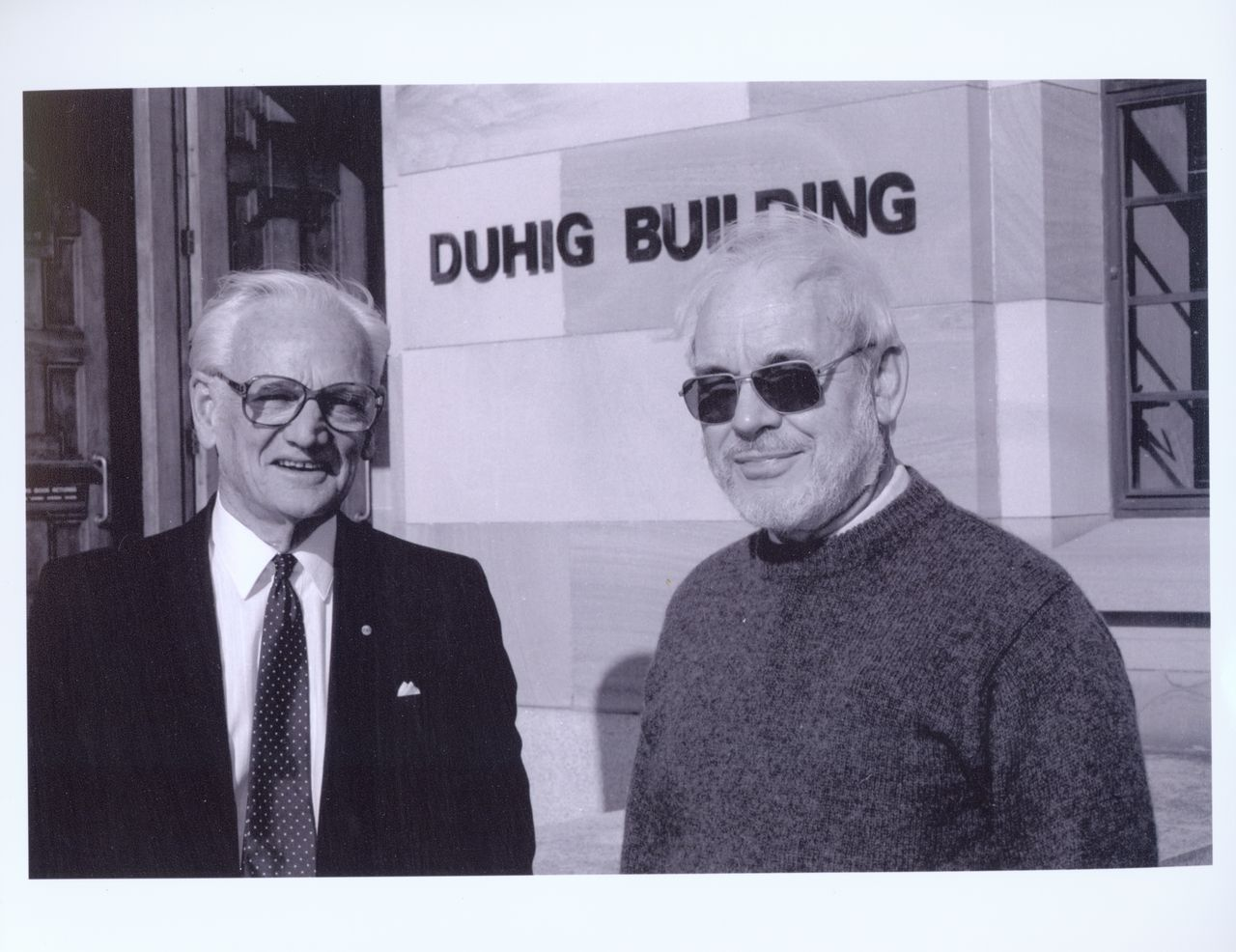
- Bryan (left) with University Librarian Derek Fielding (right) in 1992
- Born: 23 September 1923; Brisbane, Queensland, Australia
- Died: 12 February 2008 (aged 84)
- Education: University of Queensland
- Organization: National Library of Australia
- Title: Director-General
- Term: 1980-1985
- Predecessor: George Chandler (librarian)
- Successor: Warren Horton
- Awards: ALIA HCL Anderson Award, Order of Australia

Harrison Bryan AO (23 September 1923 – 12 February 2008) was an Australian librarian. He was University Librarian at the University of Queensland and University of Sydney and later Director-General of the National Library of Australia.

== Early life ==
Harrison Bryan was born in Brisbane, Queensland, the son of Walter Heywood Bryan and his wife, Myee. He attended Brisbane Grammar School. After enrolling at the University of Queensland in 1941, he joined the Army during WW2, and worked on his B.A via correspondence. He would return to study in 1946 and took Honours in history in 1947. He would later take his M.A. in history in 1954. He married his wife Florence Jolly in 1948. Despite the intention of pursuing a career in journalism or teaching, he was encouraged to consider the new field of library science. After completing the one-year course of the Public Library of New South Wales (now State Library of NSW), the only library science course then available in Australia in 1949, Bryan returned to Brisbane.

== Career ==
The University of Queensland Library, had only had one official librarian appointed to it since its establishment in 1910. Previous staff were either part time, or were doing double duty in some other role within the new University. In 1949, UQ was seeking an Assistant to the Librarian, despite there being no Librarian at all. Bryan took the job, and the position changed to an official University Librarian position a year later. The University of Queensland was undergoing a significant period of transition as it moved from its original location in George St, Brisbane, to its new location at St Lucia. Only a handful of buildings had been constructed by 1950, and the new site had been occupied by the Army during WW2. The collection was small, and most departments maintained their own smaller libraries to support their research needs. Over the next 13 years, Bryan would work steadily to increase the size of the collection, improve funding, and hire new staff. Bryan's father was a Professor in Geology at the University from 1947-1959 and the younger Bryan was well aware of the issues of the poor support of the library, and its ability to support and facilitate research. He had worked as a volunteer library staff member during his undergraduate days.

Bryan believed that the library's staff, especially the librarians, needed to have experience in research in order to have the respect of the academics on staff. After taking a Qualifying Certificate in Librarianship from the Library Association of Australia in 1951, he then went on to study his M.A in history. Bryan's report on his study leave to Great Britain in 1957 would be published as a thesis for an Associate's Diploma of the Library Association of Australia in 1960.

In 1962, Bryan was invited to become the University Librarian at the University of Sydney. The Fisher Library building was completed in 1963, and its design demonstrated significant changes to modern library design. While Bryan had had no hand in the design of the Fisher Library he would be responsible for the design of the next library building, and be influenced by new ideas emerging from Great Britain. His understanding of the need for a functional building that could adapt to future needs, and which had been designed by an architect sympathetic to libraries, would make Bryan a frequent consultant to other libraries, as they also strove to invent new models. Bryan would give librarianship a higher profile at the University of Sydney over the next 17 years under his leadership. The book collection alone increased from 775,000 to 2.7 million volumes. But this expansion also meant considerable problems in book processing, as many titles acquired through donation or book deposit meant individual cataloguing, because of their specialised nature.

== National Library of Australia ==
In 1980, Bryan became Director-General of the National Library of Australia in Canberra. The Library had been suffering from some decline due to reduced government funding of the book collection and staff cutbacks. Bryan's appointment would resolve some of the morale issues, as he worked to rebuild the reputation of the collection and its strengths. He would work toward rebuilding its leadership in the Asia-Pacific library community. His most significant achievement as Director-General was overseeing the establishment of the Australian Bibliographic Network (ABN) which had been in development for many years, enabling libraries all over Australia to link their collections and make improved interlibrary loan and collection choices. Bryan retired in July 1985.

== Memberships and awards ==
Bryan was twice President of the Library Association of Australia. He was on its General Council for 25 years. He was chair of the Committee of Australian University Librarians a number of times. Bryan wrote over 300 items of professional literature in library science and history, the most extensive list of any Australian librarian. He was a member of the Board of Examiners for Australian Academic & Research Libraries. This Board set the syllabus and examination papers for those seeking registration as librarians by the Library Association of Australia. For eight years, Bryan would chair this Board and oversee it as it evaluated courses and qualifications offered by the growing number of schools of librarianship in Australia. He served as Editor of the Australian Library Journal from 1954-1957. Bryan's reputation would lead him to be involved with the selection of almost every Australian university librarian from 1964-1979.

Through contacts forged in Great Britain during a study tour in 1957, his reputation led to his involvement with UNESCO and the Australian Department of Foreign Affairs. Bryan was a member of the UNESCO Australian Advisory Committee on Libraries for almost 10 years. He acted as an advocate for libraries in developing economies. He helped to influence a fund through the Department of Foreign Affairs to provide training for senior librarians from Africa, Asia and the Pacific region, in particular, Indonesia.

He received the HCL Anderson Award in 1984.

In 1984 he was appointed Officer of the Order of Australia. He would go on to receive honorary doctorates from three universities - Monash, Queensland and Sydney.

== Legacy ==
Bryan died in 2008. He was survived by his wife, four children, six grandchildren and one great-grandchild.
