= Mathieu Matégot =

- Born: 4 April 1910; Hungary
- Died: 2001 (aged 90–91); Angers, France
- Known for: Tapestry

Mathieu Matégot (4 April 1910 – February 2001) was a Hungarian / French designer and material artist. He was one of the most renowned French designers of the 1950s.

== Early years ==
Matégot was born on 4 April 1910 at Tápió-Sully, a village about 20 kilometres (12 mi) from Budapest in Hungary. He studied at the school of fine arts and architecture in Budapest between 1925 and 1929. He created sets for the National Theater. He then traveled in Italy and the United States before settling in France in 1931. There he took jobs that included making sets for the Folies Bergère, window dressing at the Galeries Lafayette, designing women's dresses and, in the late 1930s, creating tapestries. In 1933 he started to create his first examples of rattan furniture mounted on metal frames.

Matégot volunteered for the French army at the start of World War II (1939–45) and was taken prisoner, being freed in 1944. As a prisoner, he worked in a plant manufacturing mechanical accessories, where he learned the techniques and potential of sheet metal. After being released he became naturalized as a French citizen.

== Furniture designer ==
Following the war, Matégot established a workshop for making handcrafted furniture using a variety of materials such as metal, rattan, glass, formica, and perforated sheet metal. The workshop made chairs, tables, sideboards, desks and other objects that he had designed. At first based in Paris, the workshop later moved to Casablanca. All the furniture and other objects had clever, practical and amusing designs. Distributed to decoration shops in editions of 200, his work was extremely successful.

Matégot designed the three-legged "Nagasaki" chair in 1954 and the "Copacabana" armchair (1955/1956), both made of steel tube and perforated sheet metal, characteristic materials whose use Matégot pioneered. The Nagasaki chair is now held in the design collection at the Musée des Arts Décoratifs, Paris. The Copacabana armchair is in the design collection at the Centre Georges Pompidou, Beaubourg, Paris. Matégot furnished or decorated buildings such as the Hotel de France in Conakry, Guinea, the Drugstrore Publicis in Paris and the Maison de l'ORTF in Paris (1962).

== Return to tapestry ==
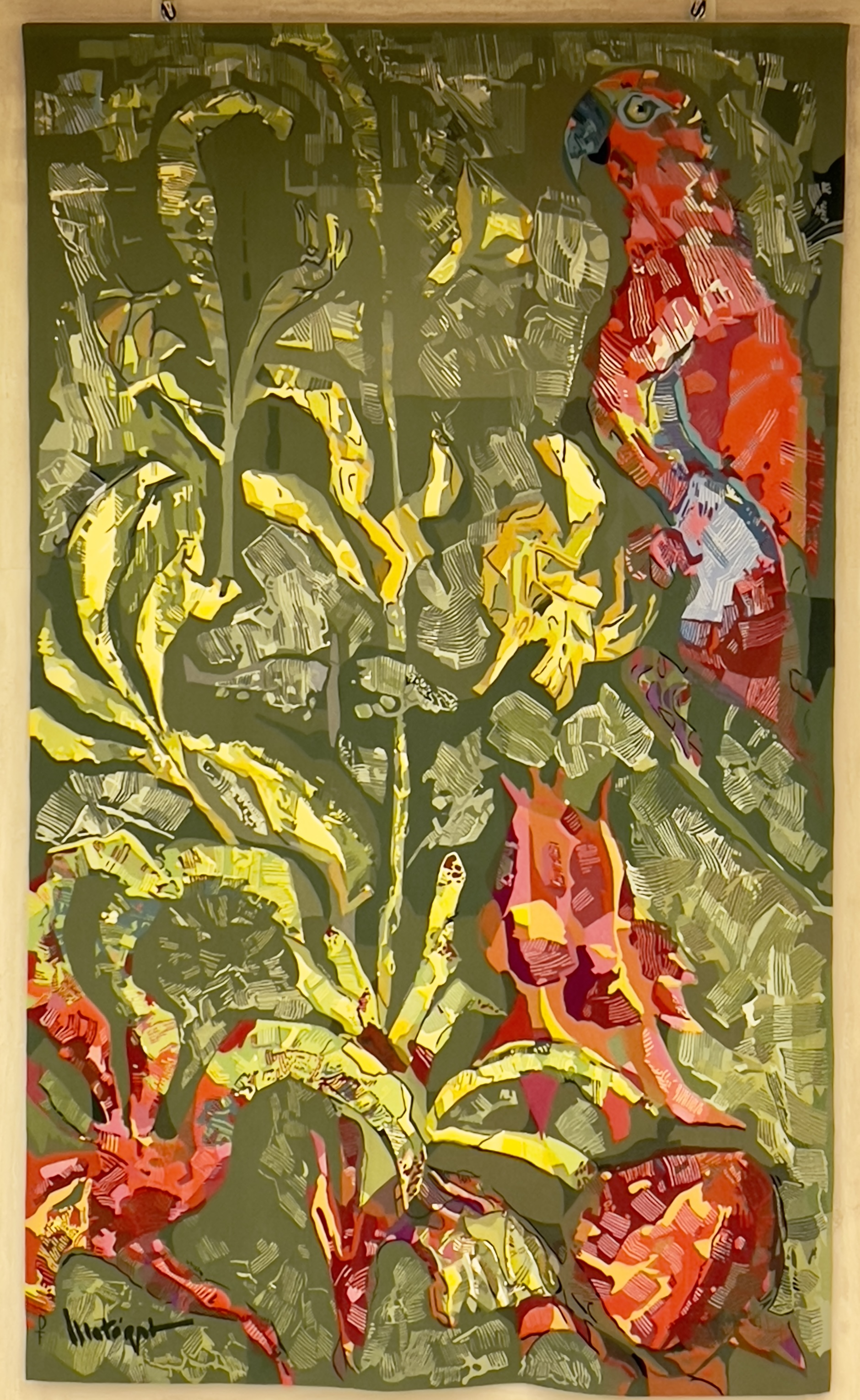
One of tapestries in the National Library of Australia.

Matégot continued to work on tapestry while engaged in other design activities, and a 1962 book La Demeure et les Éditions des deux mondes présentent les tapisseries de Mathieu Matégot documented some of his more important works to that date. In early 1960s, Matégot left furniture design to devote himself full-time to tapestry work, becoming one of leaders of the modern movement in French tapestry. His tapestries today hang in many major buildings. For example, three of his works are in the National Library of Australia. When the building was opened, the "three remarkable tapestries [were] glowing like jewels in the marble-clad foyer". He was a friend of Jean Lurçat. His work used a restrained range of colors in rigorously abstract designs. Mathieu Matégot died at Angers, France in February 2001.
