= Digital collections selection criteria =

Digital Collections Selection Criteria are applied by organisations (typically libraries) creating a digital library which of their existing holdings and forthcoming acquisitions to digitize for inclusion.

A strategy with defined selection priorities for digitization is critical, and should consider both preservation and access. factors to consider are:

1. the value of materials
2. the condition of materials
3. use of materials
4. material characteristics ensuring a high level of success

For the Library of Congress, items of national interest were prime candidates both to improve access and reduce wear and tear on the physical copies.

In the early discussions about digitization of library materials the selection decisions were often proposed based on a desire for better access to that item's content, and not on the condition or value of the original item. In 2001, Paula De Stefano wrote that a use-based group of criteria was promising, as it is "fundamental to collection development and is the common thread in all selection decisions". In practice, however, her study showed that most digital projects focused on special collections, which are generally not the most popular items in the overall collection.

The persistent risk of disappearing "last copies". and the declines seen in the condition of national treasures, as exemplified by the 2005 Heritage Health Index Report on the State of America's Collections provide the rationale for establishing priorities and balancing access with preservation needs. The transient nature of electronic information can contribute to a phenomenon called "memory loss". This is a result of data extinctions as technologies become obsolete. There is also a drift away from original bibliographic contexts as time passes.

A 1998 Council on Library and Information Sources white paper identified the following comprehensive considerations for selection:

1. assessment of the intellectual and physical nature of the source materials
2. the number and location of current and potential users
3. the current and potential nature of use
4. the format and nature of the proposed digital product and how it will be described, delivered, and archived
5. how the proposed product relates to other digitization efforts
6. projections of costs in relation to benefits

== See also ==
- Australian Web Archive
- Legal deposit
- National edeposit
- National library
- Web archive
