= National Library of Australia =

National reference library in Australia

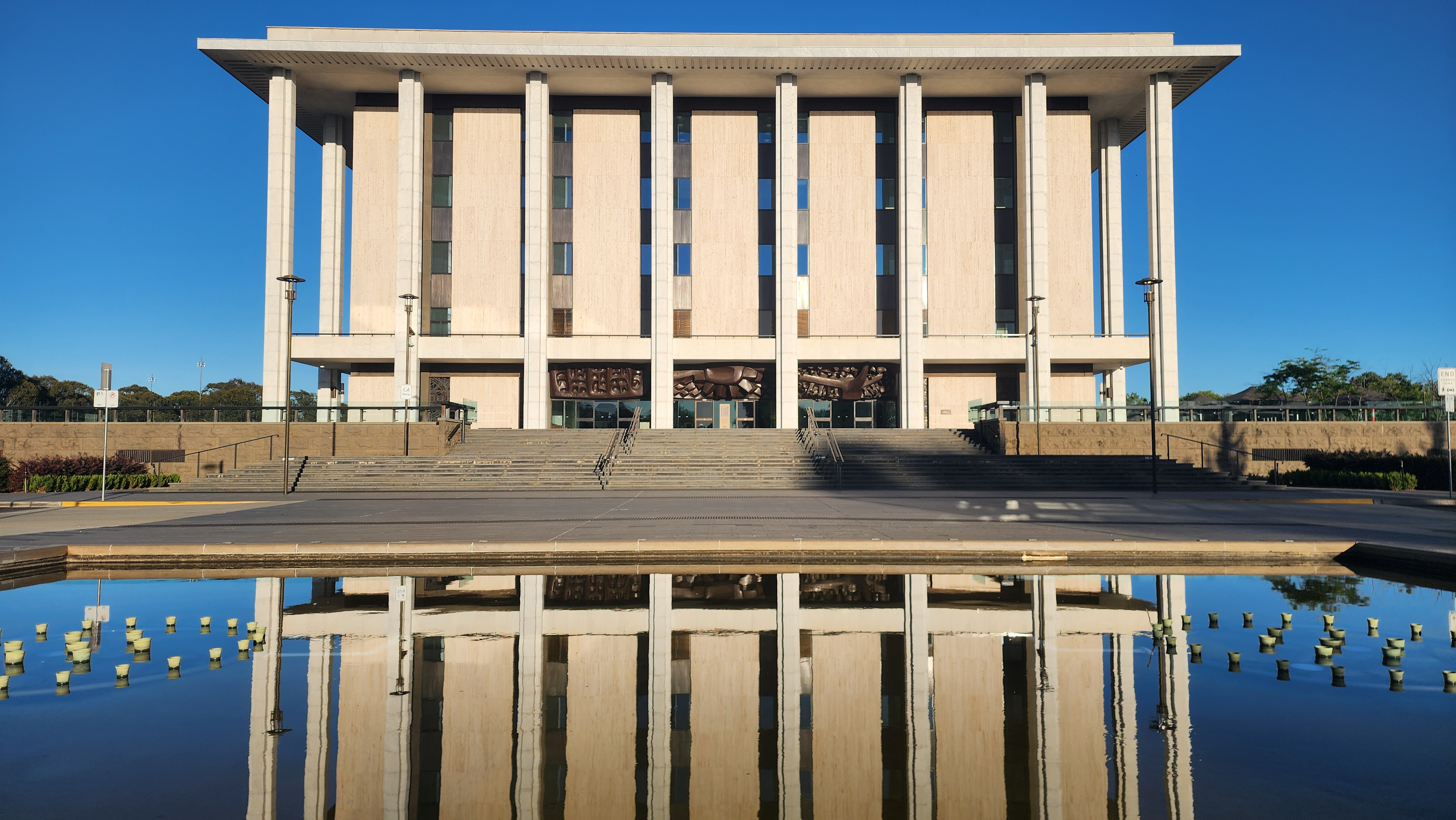
- 35°17′47″S 149°07′46″E
- Location: Canberra, Australian Capital Territory
- Type: Reference library
- Scope: Commonwealth of Australia
- Established: 23 March 1961; 65 years ago
- Reference to legal mandate: National Library Act 1960

Collection
- Items collected: Books; magazines; pictures; photographs; maps; sheet music; manuscripts; websites
- Size: 6.93 million items
- Criteria for collection: Publications made available to the Australian public
- Legal deposit: Digital and hard-copy Australian published materials

Other information
- Budget: A$100,000,000 (2025–26)
- Director: Marie-Louise Ayres
- Employees: 400 (2016)
- Website: www.library.gov.au (Automated Accessibility Score = 8.9 decimal)
- Building details
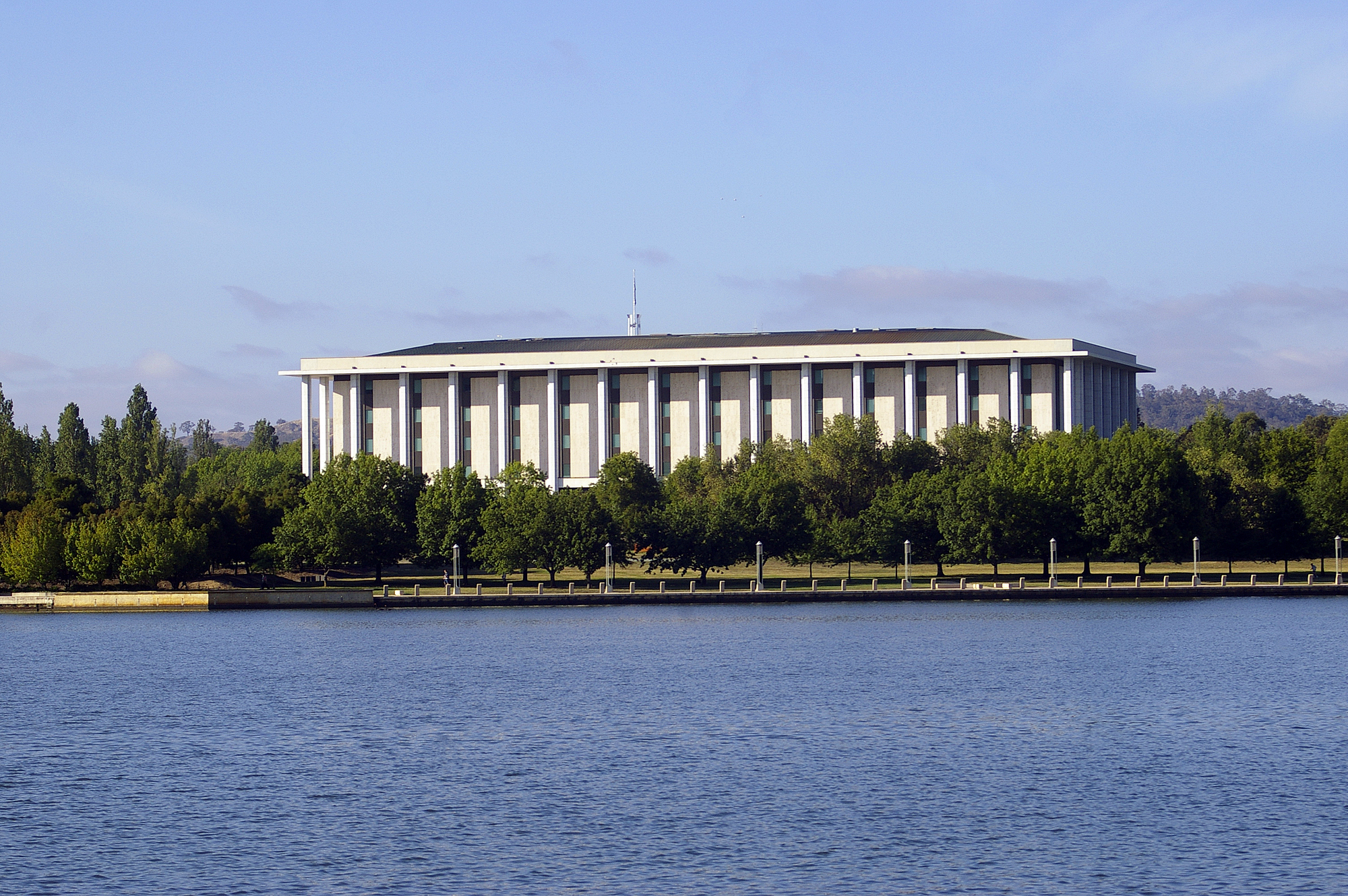
- National Library of Australia as viewed from Lake Burley Griffin, Canberra

General information
- Status: Completed
- Architectural style: Late Twentieth Century Stripped Classical
- Location: Parkes Place and King Edward Terrace, Parkes, Canberra, Australian Capital Territory, Australia
- Construction started: 1961
- Inaugurated: 15 August 1968 by Prime Minister John Gorton
- Cost: A$8 million (1968)

Technical details
- Material: Marble, granite, bronze, slate, trachyte, and copper

Design and construction
- Architect: Walter Bunning
- Architecture firm: Bunning and Madden
- Other designers: Leonard French (stained-glass windows); Mathieu Matégot (Aubusson tapestries x3); Tom Bass (copper sculpture); Henry Moore (sculpture)

Commonwealth Heritage List
- Official name: National Library of Australia and Surrounds, Parkes Pl, Parkes, ACT, Australia
- Type: Listed place
- Criteria: A., D., E., F., G., H.
- Designated: 22 June 2004
- Reference no.: 105470

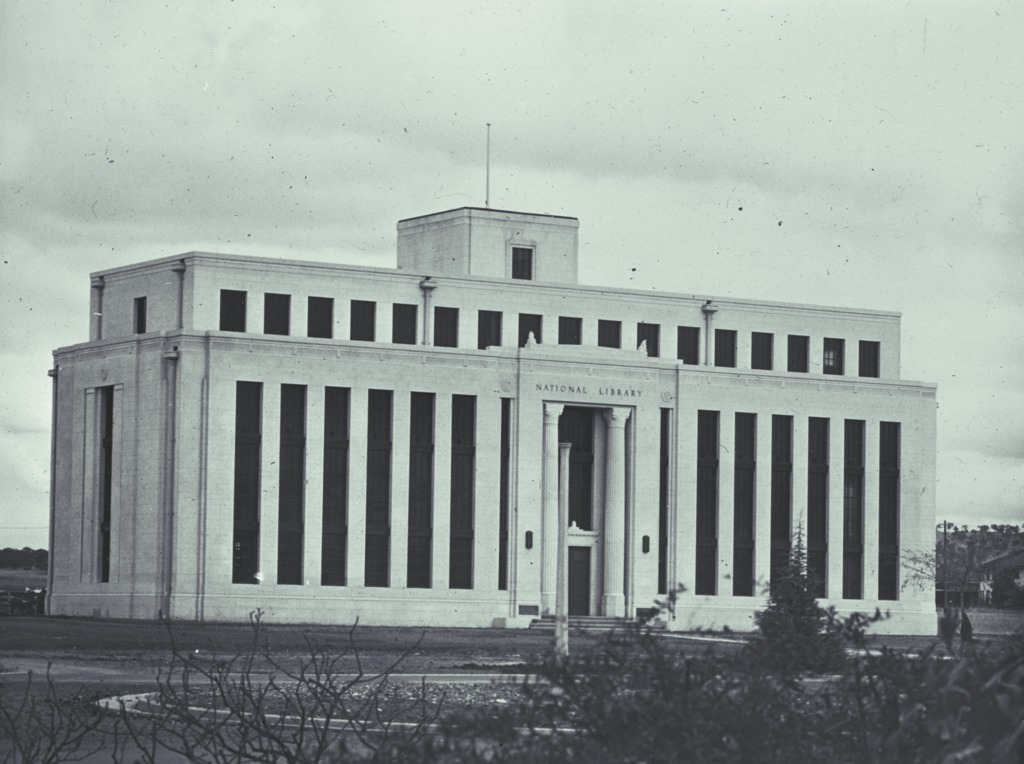
Original National Library building (1934), demolished 1968

The National Library of Australia (NLA), formerly the Commonwealth National Library and Commonwealth Parliament Library, is the largest reference library in Australia, responsible under the terms of the National Library Act 1960 for "maintaining and developing a national collection of library material, including a comprehensive collection of library material relating to Australia and the Australian people", thus functioning as a national library. It is located in Parkes, Canberra, ACT.

Created in 1960 by the National Library Act, by the end of June 2019 its collection contained 7,717,579 items, with its manuscript material occupying 17,950 metres (58,890 ft) of shelf space. The NLA also hosts and manages the Trove cultural heritage discovery service, which includes access to the Australian Web Archive and National edeposit (NED), a large collection of digitised newspapers, official documents, manuscripts and images, as well as born-digital material.

== History and foundation ==
In 1901 the Commonwealth Parliament Library was established to serve the newly formed Federal Parliament of Australia. From its inception the Commonwealth Parliamentary Library was driven to development of a truly national collection. In 1907 the Joint Parliamentary Library Committee under the Chairmanship of the Speaker, Sir Frederick William Holder defined the objective of the Commonwealth Parliamentary Library in the following words:

The Library Committee is keeping before it the ideal of building up, for the time when Parliament shall be established in the Federal Capital, a great Public Library on the lines of the world-famed Library of Congress at Washington; such a library, indeed, as shall be worthy of the Australian Nation; the home of the literature, not of a State, or of a period, but of the world, and of all time.

From 1923, two forms of name were used concurrently: Commonwealth National Library and Commonwealth Parliament Library, to designate the national and parliamentary collections respectively.

In 1957 the Paton Committee recommended a National Library as an independent statutory body.

In 1960 the National Library of Australia was created by the National Library Act 1960, and each library became a separate entity.

== Building ==
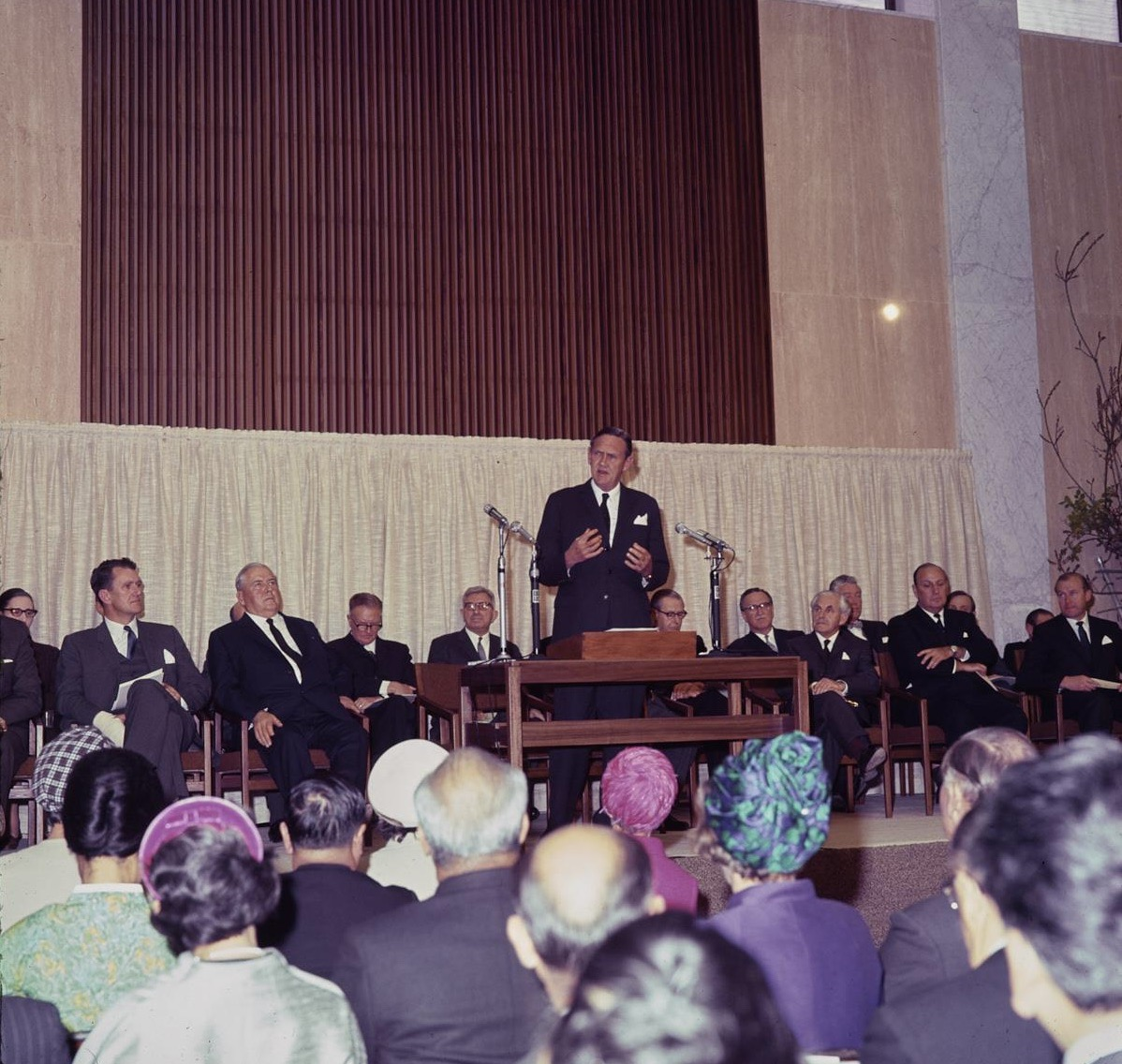
Prime Minister John Gorton officially opening the National Library on 15 August 1968

The original National Library building on Kings Avenue, Canberra was designed by Edwin Hubert Henderson (1885–1939), who was Chief Architect of the Commonwealth of Australia from 1929 to 1939, and built in 1934. Originally intended to be several wings, only one wing was completed, partly because of the advent of World War II. The 1957 Paton Committee reported that the accommodation was inadequate for a National Library. The building was used for the headquarters of the Canberra Public Library Service until its demolition in 1968, when it became the site of the Edmund Barton Building.

In 1963, prime minister Robert Menzies announced the near-completion of working plans for a new National Library building. The present library building was opened on 15 August 1968 by Prime Minister John Gorton. The building, situated in Parkes, was designed by the architectural firm of Bunning and Madden in the Late Twentieth Century Stripped Classical style. The foyer is decorated in marble, with stained-glass windows by Leonard French and three tapestries by Mathieu Matégot. A Tom Bass sculpture called Lintel Sculpture is installed over the entrance to the library.

The building was listed on the Australian Commonwealth Heritage List on 22 June 2004.

In 2004 the book A different view : the National Library of Australia and its building art was published which talked about the NLA building.

=== Reading rooms ===
The large National Library building is home to various reading rooms and collections. Usage of the reading rooms include speaking to expert staff, browsing the library's reference collection and electronic journals, ebooks, indexes, and databases. The reading rooms also provide free internet and computer use, scanning, photocopying and printing, and the request and access of collection items. On the ground floor is the Main Reading Room — this is where the bulk of the Library's Internet access terminals are located, and where wireless internet access is available. Services are also delivered on-site from the Newspaper & Family History zone on the ground floor, the Special Collections Reading Room and the Petherick Reading Room on the first floor.

== Collections ==
=== Australian and general collection ===
The library collects material produced by Australians, for Australians or about the Australian experience in all formats—not just printed works—books, serials, newspapers, maps, posters, music and printed ephemera—but also online publications and unpublished material such as manuscripts, pictures, and oral histories. The library's Australiana collections are the nation's most important resource of materials recording Australia's cultural heritage. The library has particular collection strengths in the performing arts, including dance.

The library contains a considerable collection of general overseas and rare book materials, as well as world-class Asian and Pacific collections which augment the Australiana collections. The print collections are further supported by extensive microform holdings. The library also maintains the National Reserve Braille Collection.

As a national library, the NLA is required by legal deposit provisions enshrined in the Copyright Act 1968 to collect a copy of every Australian publication in the country, which publishers must submit upon publication of the material.

Hazel de Berg began recording Australian writers, artists, musicians and others in the arts community in 1957, conducting nearly 1300 interviews. Together with the library over 27 years, she was a pioneer in the field in Australia.

A core Australiana collection is that of John A. Ferguson.

At the end of the Australian financial year of 2018–19, the National Library collection comprised 7,717,579 items, and an additional 17,950 metres (58,890 ft) of manuscript material. The library's collections of Australiana have developed into the nation's single most important resource of materials recording the Australian cultural heritage. Australian writers, editors and illustrators are actively sought and well represented, whether published in Australia or overseas.

The library's collection includes all formats of material, from books, journals, websites and manuscripts to pictures, photographs, maps, music, oral history recordings, manuscript papers and ephemera.

Approximately 94.1% of the library's collection had been catalogued by July 2019, a total of 5,453,888 items and these are discoverable through the online catalogue.

==== Digital collections ====
The library is a world leader in digital preservation techniques, and has maintained an Internet-accessible archive of selected Australian websites called the Pandora Archive since 1996. The Australian Web Archive, released in March 2019, combines records from PANDORA, the Australian Government Web Archive (AGWA), and other websites published in Australia. In the 2019 federal budget, the government allocated A$10 million to the library, intended to be spread over four years to set up a digitisation fund.

As of June 2019, the library had digitised a total of 5,508,008 images. Where possible, these are delivered directly across the Internet.

Since a 2016 amendment to the Copyright Act, all born-digital content must also be deposited in the library (with varying provisions for state libraries as well). The NLA has since May 2019 hosted and managed the National edeposit (NED) service. Libraries ACT, Libraries Tasmania, Northern Territory Library, State Library of New South Wales, State Library of Queensland, State Library of South Australia, State Library Victoria and the State Library of Western Australia are the member organisations of the collaboration.

=== Asian collections ===
The library houses the largest and most actively developing research resource on Asia in Australia, and the largest Asian language collections in the Southern hemisphere, with over half a million volumes in the collection, as well as extensive online and electronic resources. The library collects resources about all Asian countries in Western languages extensively, and resources in the following Asian languages: Burmese, Chinese, Persian, Indonesian, Japanese, Khmer, Korean, Lao, Manchu, Mongolian, Thai, Timorese, and Vietnamese.

The library has acquired a number of important Western and Asian language scholarly collections from researchers and bibliophiles. These collections include:

- Australian Buddhist Library Collection
- Braga Collection (Portuguese in Asia)
- Claasz Collection (Sri Lanka)
- Coedes Collection (Indo-China)
- London Missionary Society Collection (China)
- Luce Collection (Burma)
- McLaren-Human Collection (Korea)
- Otley Beyer Collection (Philippines)
- Sakakibara Collection (Japan)
- Sang Ye Collection (China)
- Simon Collection (East Asia)
- Harold S. Williams Collection (Japan)

The Asian Collections are searchable via the National library's catalogue.

=== Pictures and manuscripts ===
Discussion of the acquisition and preservation process of Joan Blaeu's Archipelagus Orientalis (1663) by the National Library (2013)

The National Library holds an extensive collection of pictures and manuscripts. The manuscript collection contains about 26 million separate items, covering in excess of 10,492 metres of shelf space (ACA Australian Archival Statistics, 1998). The collection relates predominantly to Australia, but there are also important holdings relating to Papua New Guinea, New Zealand and the Pacific. The collection also holds a number of European and Asian manuscript collections or single items have been received as part of formed book collections.

The Australian manuscript collections date from the period of maritime exploration and settlement in the 18th century until the present, with the greatest area of strength dating from the 1890s onwards. The collection includes a large number of outstanding single items, such as the 14th century Chertsey Cartulary, the journal of James Cook on HM Bark Endeavour, inscribed on the Memory of the World Register in 2001, the diaries of Robert O'Hara Burke and William John Wills from the Burke and Wills expedition, and Charles Kingsford Smith's and Charles Ulm's log of the Southern Cross.

A wide range of individuals and families are represented in the collection, with special strength in the fields of politics, public administration, diplomacy, theatre, art, literature, the pastoral industry and religion. Examples are the papers of Alfred Deakin, Sir John Latham, Sir Keith Murdoch, Sir Hans Heysen, Sir John Monash, Vance Palmer and Nettie Palmer, A.D. Hope, Manning Clark, David Williamson, W.M. Hughes, Sir Robert Menzies, Sir William McMahon, Lord Casey, Geoffrey Dutton, Peter Sculthorpe, Daisy Bates, Jessie Street, and Eddie Mabo and James Cook both of whose papers were inscribed on UNESCO's Memory of the World Programme Register in 2001. The Ray Mathew bequest provides for the Ray Mathew Lecture.

The library has also acquired the records of many national non-governmental organisations. They include the records of the Federal Secretariats of the Liberal party, the A.L.P, the Democrats, the R.S.L., the Australian Inland Mission, the Australian Union of Students, The Australian Ballet, the Australian Elizabethan Theatre Trust, the Australian Institute of Urban Studies, Australian Industries Protection League, the Australian Conservation Foundation, and the Australian Council of National Trusts. Finally, the library holds about 37,000 reels of microfilm of manuscripts and archival records, mostly acquired overseas and predominantly of Australian and Pacific interest.

The National Library's Pictures collection focuses on Australian people, places and events, from European exploration of the South Pacific to contemporary events. Art works and photographs are acquired primarily for their informational value, and for their importance as historical documents.

Media represented in the collection include photographs, drawings, watercolours, oils, lithographs, engravings, etchings and sculpture/busts.

=== Ephemera ===
The library contains a large amount of printed ephemera, collected since the early 1960s and also including older materials. These include minor publications, pamphlets, leaflets, invitations, cards, menus, junk mail, as well as larger publications, such as theatre programmes or retail trade catalogues. They are selected based on certain key criteria, such as information content, design elements, period representation, and portraiture. They are divided into various types or topics.

This group includes the Performing arts ephemera collection (PROMPT). Within the PROMPT collection, there are further divisions by person or topic, for instance the J.C. Williamson collection of theatre ephemera, and performers such as Dame Nellie Melba and Kylie Minogue. Since around 2017, a team of volunteers has been using the PROMPT collection to add content to the AusStage database. The J.C. Williamson Distributed Collection is held across six organisations: the NLA; Australian Performing Arts Collection in Melbourne; Mitchell Library in Sydney; Queensland Performing Arts Centre Museum; Scenic Studios Australia Pty Ltd; and Seaborn, Broughton & Walford Foundation Archives and Library collection. Both AusStage and the J.C. Williamson Distributed Collection were added to the UNESCO Australian Memory of the World Register in 2021.

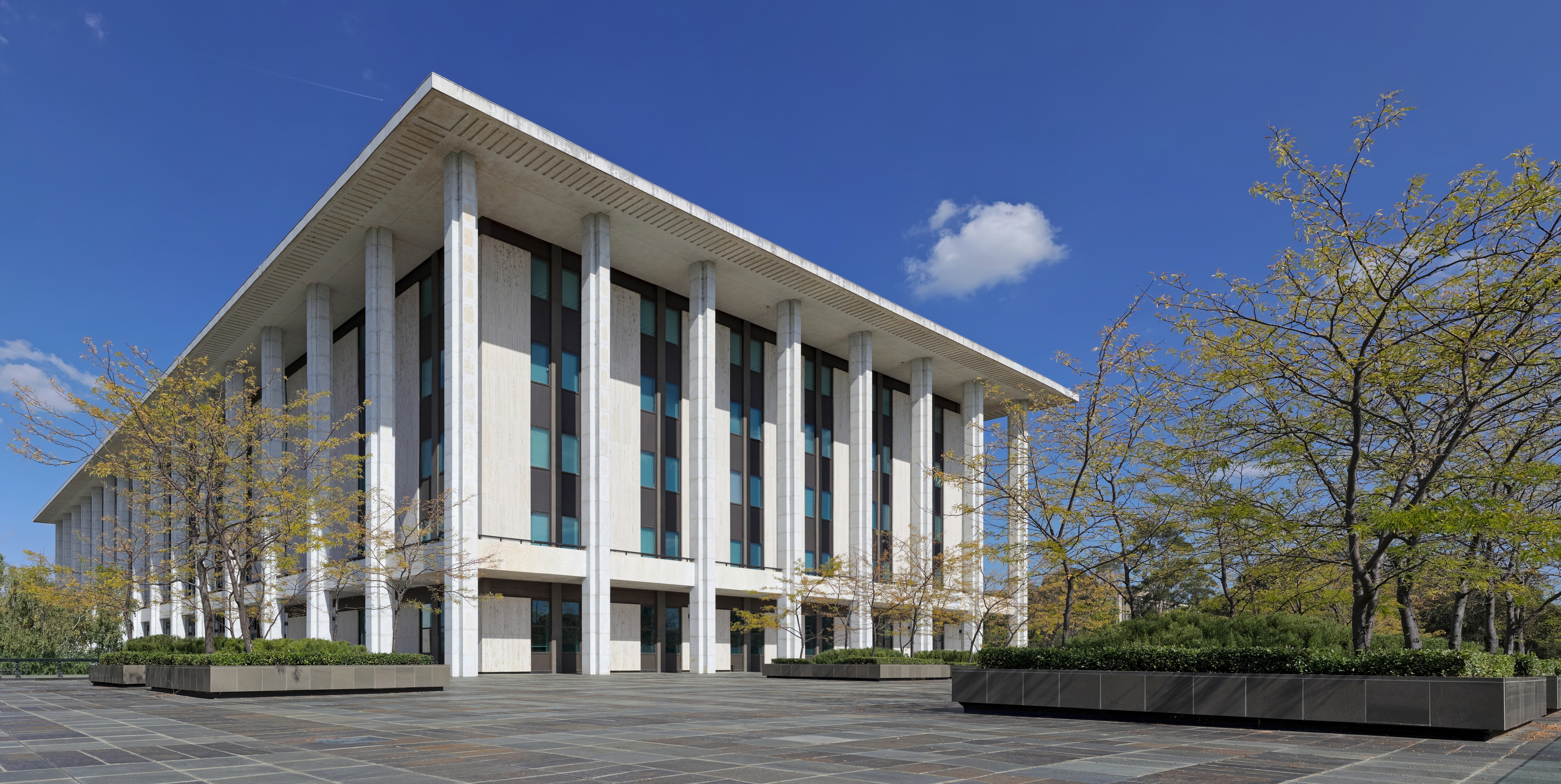
The library in 2016.

== Services ==
The National Library of Australia provides a national leadership role in developing and managing collaborative online services with the Australian library community, making it easier for users to find and access information resources at the national level. It provides services to libraries, publishers and the general public, with membership available to residents of Australia providing access to additional services.

Some of the components of the services are:

- For publishers:
  - Prepublication Data Service, ISSNs and ISMNs for Australian publishers.
  - National edeposit (NED), to fulfill legal deposit obligations. NLA hosts and manages the service, whereby all born-digital content published in Australia, as required by legal deposit legislation under the Copyright Act 1968, is deposited remotely by the publisher, stored and made accessible to member libraries and the public.
- For librarians:
  - The Australian National Bibliographic Database (ANBD) and offers free access through the Libraries Australia subscription-based service. It is used for reference, collection development, cataloguing and interlibrary lending.
  - National Libraries Gateway.
- Online, for the general public:
  - The Australian Web Archive, which now incorporates PANDORA (established 1996), the Australian Government Web Archive (AWA) and the ".au" domain archive.
  - National Library of Australia Catalogue, a catalogue of resources in NLA which are available to the general public.
  - Ask a Librarian for users in need of research assistance or general information about the National Library of Australia.

=== Trove ===
The Trove logo

The online services mentioned above, and more, are accessible via the Trove service, which was launched in 2009. Trove is an online library database aggregator, a centralised national service built with the collaboration of major libraries of Australia. Trove's most well known feature is the digitised collection of Australian newspapers. Most NLA resource discovery services are now fully integrated with Trove. The service is able to locate resources about Australia and Australians, which reaches many locations otherwise unavailable to external search engines.

=== Publishing ===
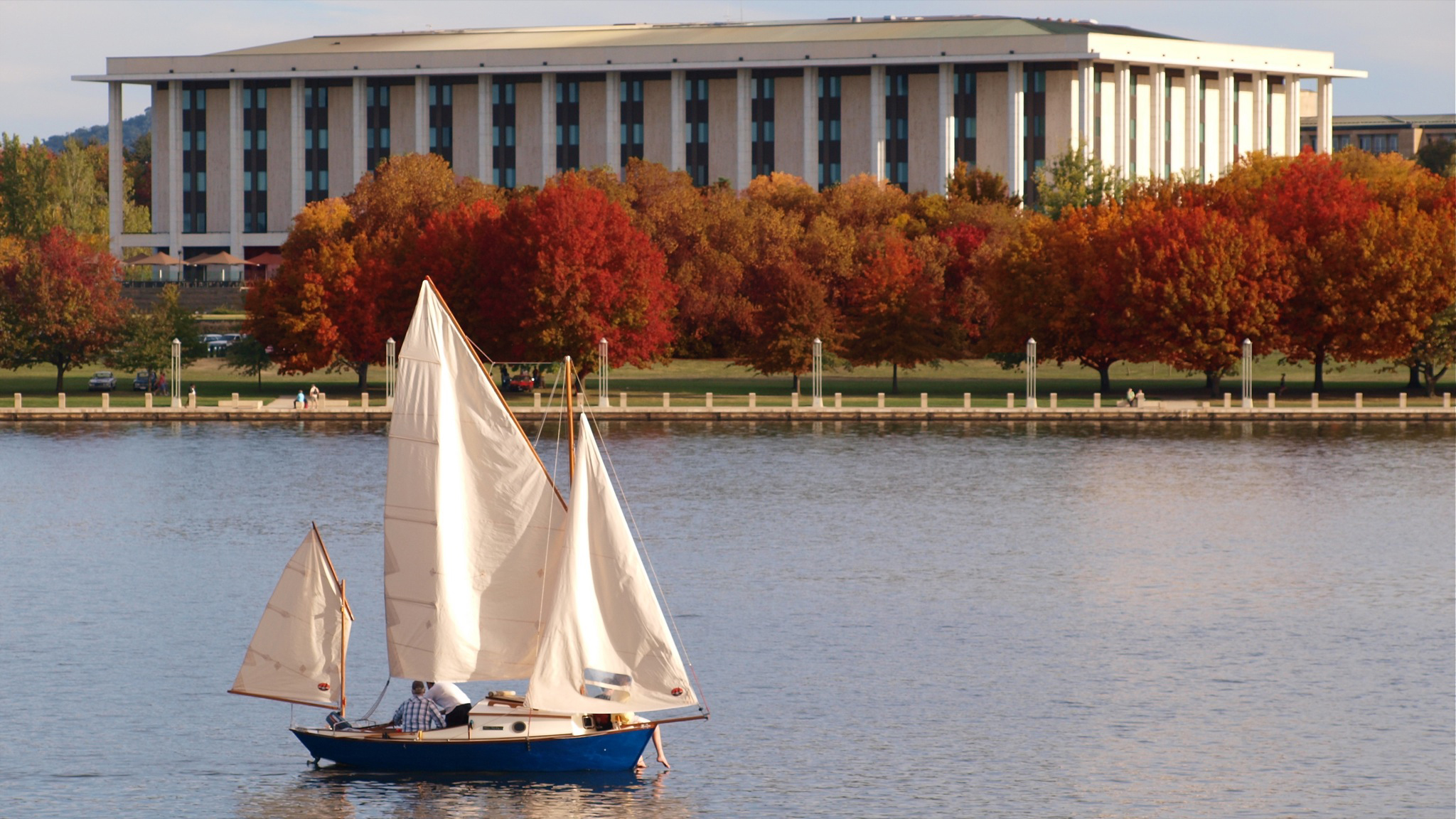
The library seen from Lake Burley Griffin in autumn.

The library produces non-fiction and children's books which explore the collections. These cover subjects including History, Natural History and Art. NLA Publishing has been a recipient of several Eve Pownall Award for Information Books.

=== Membership ===
Free registration with the library is allowed for all Australian residents, with cards sent to a physical address before use is allowed. Membership confers some extra benefits for users of the library, such as requesting items for use onsite in the reading rooms, and access to a select range of licensed electronic resources from offsite, such as the full text of Encyclopaedia Britannica. Electronic copies of some items are able to be ordered, and for members who can visit the library in person, inter-library loans may be obtained to use in the reading rooms.

== Directors-General ==
The following individuals have been appointed as Director-General or any precedent titles:

Directors-General of the National Library of Australia
Ordinal	Officeholder	Title	Term begin	Term end	Time in office	Notes
1	Arthur Wadsworth	Interim Commonwealth Parliamentary Librarian	1901	1927	25–26 years	
2	Kenneth Binns CBE	Commonwealth Parliamentary Librarian	1927	1947	19–20 years	
3	Harold Leslie White CBE	National Librarian	1947	1970	22–23 years	
4	Allan Percy Fleming CBE	National Librarian	1970	1974	3–4 years	
5	George Chandler	Director-General	1974	1980	5–6 years	
6	Harrison Bryan AO	Director-General	1980	1985	4–5 years	
7	Warren Horton AM	Director-General	1985	1999	13–14 years	
8	Jan Fullerton AO	Director-General	1999	2010	10–11 years	
9	Anne-Marie Schwirtlich	Director-General	2011	2017	5–6 years	
10	Marie-Louise Ayres	Director-General	2017	2026	9 years	
11	Ms Alison Dellit	Director-General	2026	present	>1 years	

== Funding problems ==
In 2016, with threatened funding cuts to Trove, a public campaign led to a government commitment of A$16.4 million in December 2016, spread over four years.

By early 2020, with the surge in demand for all types of digital services, the National Library was having to cope with increasingly dwindling staff resources to develop services on Trove and National edeposit, and undertook a restructure of its staffing and operations.

== Web accessibility ==
In September 2025, the website of the National Library of Australia was tested for conformance with Web Content Accessibility Guidelines (WCAG), in its version WCAG 2.2, using Pope Tech, Wikidata Q136356968 as evaluation platform, which, in turn, uses WAVE web accessibility evaluation tool, Wikidata Q136357132 as automated web accessibility evaluation tool (AWAET). The website of National Library of Australia obtained a score of 8.9 decimal out of 10. The test was taken on September 2025 as part of a research on web accessibility of national libraries around the world.

== See also ==
- List of national and state libraries
- National and State Libraries Australia
- Parliamentary Triangle, Canberra
- Parliamentary Library of Australia
