= Augustus H. Tulk =

Australian linguist

Augustus Henry Tulk (28 August 1810 – 1 September 1873) was the first librarian of the State Library of Victoria, Australia. He also campaigned for the establishment of an art gallery in Victoria.

The State Library's cafe, 'Mr. Tulk', is named in his honour.

== Life ==
Tulk was born on 28 September 1810 in Richmond, Surrey, England, the son of Charles Augustus Tulk and his wife Susannah, and received a solid classical education at Winchester College. He emigrated from England to Australia for medical reasons in 1854.

Tulk was chosen from a short-list of forty eight applicants, and began his new job on 5 May 1856. His legacy includes the collection of some 80,000 volumes he collected and a relatively advanced system of classification according to books' subjects. Tulk turned down offers of appointment from other libraries in Sydney and abroad. A noted linguist, Tulk continued his studies adding native Fijian and Aboriginal languages to his repertoire.
