= Warren Horton =

Australian librarian

- Born: 23 June 1938
- Died: 25 November 2003 (aged 65)
- Occupation: Librarian
- Organization: National Library of Australia
- Title: Director-General
- Term: 1985-1999
- Predecessor: Harrison Bryan
- Successor: Jan Fullerton
- Spouse: Patsy Hardy (m. 1985–1994)

Warren Michael Horton, AM (23 June 1938 – 25 November 2003) was an Australian librarian who held senior positions as Director-General, National Library of Australia (1985–1999), State Library of Victoria (1981–1985) and Deputy of the State Library of New South Wales (1975–1981).

== Early life ==
Warren Michael Horton was born in Ryde, New South Wales on 23 June 1938. His parents were John Horton and Iris Purcell. He attended Dee Why Public School and in 1949 won a scholarship to attend Canberra Grammar School where he completed his schooling.

== Career ==
=== 1957–1981: State Library of New South Wales ===
Warren Horton began his library career at the State Library of New South Wales in 1957, rising through the ranks to Deputy of the State Library of New South Wales from 1975 to 1981.

=== 1981–1985: State Library of Victoria ===
State Librarian of Victoria between 1981 and 1985.

=== 1985–1999: National Library of Australia ===
He was Director-General, National Library of Australia, Canberra from 1985 to 1999. During this period the library refocussed from collecting printed materials from overseas and expanded the development of the Australian collections to include both print and electronic materials.

Warren Horton was instrumental in the establishment of the Aurora Foundation which seeks to "develop leadership capacity in the library and information management professions in Australia and New Zealand".

He was a member of the Australian National Commission for UNESCO from 1993 to 1996.

From 1991 to 1997 he was the first member of the executive board of the International Federation of Library Associations and Institutions from the Pacific region, subsequently receiving the IFLA Gold Medal and a Fellowship from the organisation.

== Awards ==
- 1985 Fellow of the Australian Library and Information Association
- 1992 HCL Anderson award conferred by the Australian Library and Information Association
- 1992 Member of the Order of Australia for services to librarianship
- 1996 National Book Council Gold Medal
- 1997 International Federation of Library Associations and Institutions Gold Medal
- 1999 Honorary Fellow of the International Federation of Library Associations and Institutions (IFLA)
- 2001 Centenary Medal

Warren Horton was awarded an Honorary Doctor of Letters (HonDLitt) by the La Trobe University in Victoria and the honorary degree of Doctor of the university by the University of Canberra on 28 July 2000.

== Personal life ==
He married historian Patsy Hardy in 1985; she had been a Field Historian at the State Library of Victoria. She died of cancer in 1994. Warren Horton died on 25 November 2003, also of cancer.
