= Sue Roberts (librarian) =

English-Antipodean librarian

Sue Roberts MCLIP
- Born: 1970 (age 55–56)
- Citizenship: UK
- Occupation: librarian
- Employer(s): Edge Hill University, Victoria University of Wellington, Victoria State Library, University of Auckland

Sue Roberts MCLIP is an English-Antipodean librarian. After studying in the UK (BA (Hons), DipLib, MA) and working at Edge Hill University in Lancashire, she has held a series of library leadership roles in Australia and New Zealand, including a period as head of the State Library of Victoria. She currently leads the libraries at the University of Auckland.

== Career ==
- Dean of Learning Services, Edge Hill University, Ormskirk, Lancashire
- University Librarian, Victoria University of Wellington 2007–2012
- CEO and State Librarian, Victoria State Library, Melbourne 2012–2015
- University Librarian, University of Auckland 2016–present

== Selected works ==
- Leadership: The Challenge for the Information Profession, with Jennifer Rowley. 2008. ISBN 1856046095
- Managing information services, with Jennifer Rowley. 2004. ISBN 9781856045155
- Developing the new learning environment : the changing role of the academic librarian, with Philippa Levy. 2005. ISBN 9781856045308.
