= Anne-Marie Schwirtlich =

Former Director-General of the National Library of Australia

- Occupation: Librarian
- Years active: 1978-current
- Organization: National Library of Australia
- Title: Director-General
- Term: 2011–2017
- Predecessor: Jan Fullerton
- Successor: Marie-Louise Ayres

Anne-Marie Lucienne Schwirtlich AM, is an Australian librarian who was the Director-General of the National Library of Australia from 2011 to 2017. In 2015, she was appointed a Member of the Order of Australia (AM).

== Early life and education ==
Born in Bombay in India to a French-speaking Mauritian mother and a German-speaking Czech father, Anne-Marie Schwirtlich spent her early years living in Bombay where she attended the Pck Presentation Convent Primary School in Kodaikanal. With her parents she migrated to Australia in 1972 and attended Turramurra High School in Sydney in New South Wales. She completed her education at Macquarie University in Sydney where she took her Bachelor of Arts degree in ancient history. She also graduated from the University of New South Wales with a Diploma in Archives Administration.

== Career ==
In 1978, she commenced her career in the Australian Public Service before moving on to a post as Senior Curator of Printed and Written Records and Art (1988–1994) at the Australian War Memorial. Schwirtlich was Director of Access and Information Services at the National Archives of Australia (1995–1998) and acting director of Australian Collections and Information Services at the National Library of Australia (1998). She was Assistant Director-General of Public and Reader Services at the National Archives of Australia (1998–2000); Director-General of the National Archives of Australia (2000–2003); chief executive officer of the State Library of Victoria (2003–2011) and was the Director-General of the National Library of Australia from 2011 to 2017.

Schwirtlich served as a Member (2003–2017) and as Chair (2004–2006) of the National & State Libraries Australasia; she was President of the Australian Society of Archivists (1989–1990); she has been a Fellow of the Society since 1992 and was their first Laureate in 1993 for outstanding service to the Society. In addition, she has been a member of the National Collections Heritage Committee, the Australia–China Council and is the Deputy Chair of the Art Exhibitions Australia Board.

In 2008, Schwirtlich became a Fellow of the Institute of Public Administration Australia in Victoria. In 2015 she was appointed a Member of the Order of Australia "for significant service to the library and archives sector through leadership roles at state and national levels, and to professional information management organisations". In 2016 she was awarded the Ifould Award by the State Library of New South Wales for "distinguished service to Australian libraries and archives and leadership within the cultural sector". In the same year she received the Redmond Barry Award by the Australian Library and Information Association for her outstanding contribution to the library and information sector in Australia and was elected as an Honorary Fellow of the Australian Academy of the Humanities. She is currently serving as a member of the Council of the Australian National University.

== Awards ==
- 1993 – Laureate – Australian Society of Archivists
- 2015 – Member – Order of Australia
- 2016 – Ifould Award – State Library of New South Wales
- 2016 – winner ALIA Awards—Redmond Barry Award
- 2016 – recipient—Honorary Fellow of the Australian Academy of the Humanities.
