= Henry Charles Lennox Anderson =

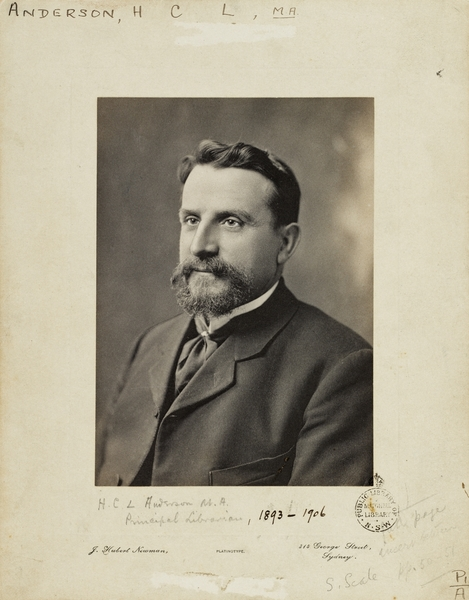
- Studio portrait of H.C.L. Anderson, photographed by J. Hubert Newman from the collection at the State Library of New South Wales
- Born: 10 May 1853
- Died: 17 March 1924 (aged 70)

Henry Charles Lennox (H.C.L.) Anderson (10 May 1853 – 17 March 1924) was instrumental in the establishment of the Mitchell Library (now The State Library of New South Wales) and held the position of Principal Librarian of the New South Wales Free Public Library as it was then known, from 1893 - 1906.

The Australian Library and Information Association’s H.C.L. Anderson award, named in his memory, is given for outstanding service to the Library profession.

== Early life and education ==
Henry Charles Lennox Anderson was born at sea on the Empire on 10 May 1853. His father, Robert Anderson, later became a police inspector, and his mother was Margaret, née Hewson. H.C.L. Anderson attended Sydney Grammar School before attaining a scholarship to attend the University of Sydney.

== Agricultural career ==
Anderson was appointed New South Wales's first Director of Agriculture in February 1890, a department that was established as a branch of the Department of Mines. In 1891, he established the Hawkesbury Agricultural College and the following year, established the Wagga Wagga Experiment Farm.

== Contribution to the library industry ==
Anderson did not seek a career in libraries, he found himself in the role of Principal Librarian when in 1893 his Agriculture department was closed down and on September 1, 1893 he was appointed Principal Librarian of the Free Public Library at a reduced salary, a position for which it is reported he had 'no desire'. Despite an inauspicious beginning, Anderson became internationally known for developing 101 rules of cataloguing with the use of subject headings. In 1896 he published Guide to the Catalogues of the Reference Library. An active member of the Library Association of Australasia, he trained staff and was first to employ women – partly due to their willingness to accept lower salaries. Under Anderson’s leadership, the Free Public Library underwent considerable changes with revitalised services and collections developed. He became Registrar of Copyright in 1901, the same year that he introduced the Dewey Decimal Classification system to the Library.

Anderson first met David Scott Mitchell in 1895 and played a major role in encouraging the collector to bequeath and finance his collections to the Library. Anderson provided space for Mitchell’s collection of 10,000 volumes by moving out of his house in 1898. It took a public inquiry and five years before planning began for the Mitchell Wing of the Free Public Library.

His time as Principal Librarian was not without controversy being accused of fraud and misappropriation of library materials. A Legislative Assembly Select Committee investigated complaints that he used postal concessions, sold donations, and gave preference to some booksellers, and included ‘blue’ books in the collections. After five years of investigation, he was exonerated with recommendations made for proper housing of the Mitchell Collection. In 1905 Anderson became director of the State Intelligence Department and in 1907 Government Statistician. In 1908 he returned to the re-established Department of Agriculture – accepting the position because it paid better than the Library.

=== H.C.L. Anderson Award ===
Named in memory of H.C.L. Anderson, the HCL Anderson Award is the highest honour that can be bestowed on an Associate member of the Australian Library and Information Association. "It is awarded in recognition of outstanding service to the library and information profession in Australia, to ALIA, or to the theory of library and information science or to the practice of library and information services."

In 2024, State Library of South Australia director Geoff Strempel won the award.
