= List of libraries in Tasmania =

This is a list of libraries in Tasmania.

- State Library of Tasmania

== Academic libraries ==
- Morris Miller Library (University of Tasmania) (named after E. Morris Miller)
- Carington Smith Library (University of Tasmania)

== Public libraries ==
There are 45 public libraries in Tasmania. They are managed by Libraries Tasmania. In small towns, some public libraries are also school libraries.

- Beaconsfield Library (Beaconsfield)
- Bicheno Library (Bicheno)
- Bothwell Library (Bothwell)
- Bridgewater Library (Bridgewater)
- Bridport Library (Bridport)
- Bruny Online (Bruny Island)
- Burnie Library (Burnie)
- Campbell Town Library (Campbell Town)
- Currie Library (Currie)
- Cygnet Library (Cygnet)
- Deloraine Library (Deloraine)
- Devenport Library (Devenport)
- Exeter Library (Exeter)
- Geeveston Library (Geeveston)
- Glenorchy Library
- Hobart Library
- Huonville Library
- Kingston Library
- Kinimathatakinta (George Town)
- Latrobe Library (Latrobe)
- Launceston Library (Launceston)
- Lilydale Library (Lilydale)
- Longford Library (Longford)
- New Norfolk Library (New Norfolk)
- Oatlands Library (Oatlands District High School)
- Orford Library (Orford)
- Penguin Library (Penguin)
- Queenstown Library (Queenstown)
- Ravenswood Library (Ravenswood)
- Ringarooma Library (Ringarooma)
- Rosebery Library (Rosebury District High School)
- Rosny Library (Rosny)
- Scottsdale Library
- Sheffield Library (Sheffield School)
- Smithton Library (Smithton)
- Sorell Library (Sorell)
- St Helens Library (St Helens)
- St Marys Library (St Marys)
- Strahan Library (Strahan Primary School)
- Swansea Library (Swansea Primary School)
- Ulverstone Library (Ulverstone)
- Westbury Library (Westbury)
- Whitemark Library (Whitemark)
- Wynyard Library (Wynyard)
- Zeehan Library (Zeehan)

== Special libraries ==
=== GLAM libraries ===
- Allport Library and Museum of Fine Arts
- Mona Library (Museum of Old and New Art)
- Tasmanian Museum and Art Gallery Library

=== Historical ===
- Tasmanian archives

=== Legal libraries ===
- Tasmanian Parliamentary Library and Research Services

== See also ==
- Mechanics' institutes of Australia
