= Archives Office of Tasmania =

Australian State Archive

Agency overview
- Formed: December 1965
- Preceding agency: Archives Section (State Library of Tasmania)
- Jurisdiction: Archives Act 1965 (repealed 1984); Archives Act 1983 (No. 76/1983)
- Headquarters: Hobart, Tasmania
- Minister responsible: Department of Education
- Agency executive: State Archivist
- Parent department: State Library of Tasmania

The Archives Office of Tasmania (AOT), 1965-Ongoing is the Tasmanian government agency responsible for the archival records of the State of Tasmania. The Archives Act 1965 established the Archives Office of Tasmania as an independent entity, but it remained within the then Tasmanian State Library Department.

The Archives Act 1983 made the Archives Office an agency with certain administration remaining within the State Library Department.

While the agency has undergone name changes, the Archives Office of Tasmania has been maintained under the Archives Act 1983, which states that "there shall continue to be an office and repository in Tasmania to be known as the 'Archives Office of Tasmania'".

== Background ==
Prior to the establishment of the Archives Office of Tasmania the official records of the Government of Tasmania were maintained by the various government authorities who created them. They were preserved in the main in vaults, store-rooms and attics associated with the premises in which the departments were placed.

The largest of these collections were in the Chief Secretary's vault. In January 1920 John Moore-Robinson was appointed to the newly created position of librarian-publicity officer in the Chief Secretary’s Department with the responsibility of the care for the records and newspapers in the Chief Secretary's vault. In the 1920s Amelia Wayn was employed as an indexer and compiled indexes of major sources of information at her disposal, the newspapers and Governors dispatches.

In 1941, Amelia Wayn was awarded an Order of the British Empire – Member (Civil) for public service in Tasmania. Amelia Wayn continued her indexing and research up until 1949.

During his tenure, John Moore-Robinson was responsible for the theft of many records in the Chief Secretary's Department vaults and profiteered on the sale of Tasmanian records. The sale of the records were often through a third party such as Angus & Robertson, Crisp and Crisp legal firm and Hill of Content book shop in Melbourne. These collections were purchased by Edmund la Touche Armstrong, William Dixson and C. M. Lucas.

Another instance of theft was that of William Bispham Propsting who was caught vandalizing and stealing from the State archives collection when he removed the pages of his ancestor Henry Propsting from the official Tasmanian convict records.

In 1940 the government was campaigned by Morris Miller to establish a Tasmanian archives. As a first step he encouraged the government to invite Professor RM Crawford to report on the current circumstances of the Tasmanian archives collection.

=== Establishment of the archives ===
In 1943 the Public Records Act was legislated. The Act's aim was to preserve records determined to be State's archives, administer public access, and authorise the destruction of non State archives.

Introducing that bill on 30 March 1943, the Chief Secretary dwelt on the importance of the historical aspects of Tasmania and concluded that it was necessary “for the Government to take action to prevent the removal and destruction of historical documents relating to the State’s development”. The Leader of the Opposition Henry Baker opposed the bill. It was amended and passed in April 1943.

The Tasmanian Public Records Act 1943 was the second such measure to be enacted in Australia. The 1943 Act was, copied very closely from Part VI of the South Australian Public Library, Museum and Art Gallery and Institutes Act. In 1943 the Archives was formally established with Amelia Wayn managing the collection. In 1949 Robert Sharman took over this role. The Libraries Act 1943 established the State Library of Tasmania, administered by the Tasmanian Library Board which in 1949 also took control of the State Archives collection.

In 1958 Morris Miller reported that in the early 1950's, the early volumes of the Hobart Town Gazette went missing from the Chief Secretary's vaults in Hobart.

In 1959, nineteen documents of Convict Department provenance were recovered from a private museum at Port Arthur. In 1963, the same museum was again displaying similar archives, this resulted in the McGinniss case.

== History ==
=== Establishment of The Archives Office of Tasmania ===
The Archives Act 1965 formalised the Archives Office of Tasmania as an independent entity, however it remained within the then Tasmanian State Library Department.

The Archives Act 1965 states:

"The Board shall establish an office and repository to be known as the 'Archives Office of Tasmania' in which such State records as are made available to the Board and are, considered by it to be worthy of preservation shall be deposited and preserved as State archives".

The 1983 Archives Act made the Archives Office an agency in its own right within the hierarchy of the State Library Department.

=== Locations of collections ===
Prior to 1962 the Chief Secretary's vault under the Supreme Court of Tasmania became, by default, a kind of ungazetted State Archives.

In 1962 the Library's headquarters moved to newly built premises at 91 Murray Street, to which a further building was added in 1972. There was an Archives level initially used for public access.

In 1986 a one-time steel store in Berriedale was rebuilt, modified, and air-conditioned to provide records storage, processing areas, and offices. Power operated mobile shelving was fitted throughout the building to give 8500 linear metres of shelving. An expansion of the Archives Office’s repository at Berriedale was completed in 1992. Incorporated in this extension was a film storage area with separate environmental conditions from the main repository space.

In 1994 the public access and offices moved to 77 Murray Street but the Archives Office of Tasmania retained its level 7 storage in the Library building. The relocation gave the Office a street front, street level access and considerably enlarged and enhanced areas for both public and staff as well as improved security systems.

The offices and reading room at 77 Murray Street closed in 2008 and the collection became publicly known as the Tasmanian Archive and Heritage Office.

In 2022 the Berriedale Repository was replaced by one in Geilston Bay. Over 14 kilometres of archival items were relocated to the purpose-built repository. The building, which provides capacity of up to 28 linear kilometres of shelving, includes contemporary climate control systems, security and fire alert systems, a cool store for film and colour photography, and a dedicated room to store magnetic media.

== Scope of collection ==
The Archives collection includes material dating from early European settlement to the present day. It is acquired from government agencies, purchase, donations or bequests.

Tasmania’s convict records are part of the UNESCO Memory of the World International Register along with the convicts records held by the New South Wales State Archives Collection and State Records Office of Western Australia.

The Collection also includes records relating but not limited to: adoptions, fostering and out-of-home care, immigration, births, deaths and marriages, cemetery records, census, musters and electoral rolls, child and youth migrants, church registrations, community welfare organisations, company registration, court records, shipping passenger departures, divorces, inquests, land records, court records, lighthouses, naturalisations, prison records, publicans’ licenses, Royal Derwent Hospital, schools and education, shipping and ships’ crews, records relating to Tasmanian Aboriginal people and the Black War and the Van Diemen's Land Company.

== State Archivists ==
The position of State Archivist, is an independent regulator of state and local government recordkeeping, the disposal and retention of State records, which remains the core function of the Archives Office.

Ordinal	Name	Title	Term start	Term end	Time in office	Notes
1	Amelia Wayn	Principal Archivist/State Archivist	1943	1949	6 Years	
2	Robert Sharman	Principal Archivist/State Archivist	1949	1959	10 Years	
3	Peter Eldershaw	Principal Archivist/State Archivist	1960	1967	7 year	
4	Michael Saclier	Principal Archivist/State Archivist	1968	1972	4 years	
5	Mary McRae	Principal Archivist/State Archivist	1972	1983	11 years	
6	Ian Pearce	Principal Archivist/State Archivist	1984	2009	26 years	
7	Ross Latham	Principal Archivist/State Archivist	2010	Current	15–16 years	

== Administration ==
Under the leadership of Siobhan Gaskell, Director of the State Library of Tasmania, the Archives Office and Heritage Collections of the State Library merged to form the Tasmanian Archive & Heritage Office (TAHO). This merger was completed in late 2007. Subsequently the Allport Library and Museum of Fine Arts and the Crowther Collection, previously part of TAHO, are now administered by Libraries Tasmania.

Even though administratively the title has been publicly changed, the Archives Office of Tasmania remains as an entity today. The Archives Act 1983 states that:

"There shall continue to be an office and repository in Tasmania to be known as the 'Archives Office of Tasmania' in which such State records as are made available to the State Archivist and are considered by him to be worthy of preservation shall be deposited and preserved as State archives".
