= National edeposit =

Australian repository for electronic publications for copyright purposes

National edeposit (NED) is a collaboration between Australia's nine national, state and territory libraries which provides for the legal deposit, management, storage and preservation of, and access to, published electronic material across Australia. It is a website, a system and a service, the result of a project by National and State Libraries Australia, and is a world-first collaboration. The National Library of Australia (NLA), Libraries ACT, Libraries Tasmania, Northern Territory Library, State Library of New South Wales, State Library of Queensland, State Library of South Australia, State Library Victoria and the State Library of Western Australia are the member organisations, while the system is hosted and managed by the NLA.

== Legal deposit in Australia ==
The federal Copyright Act 1968 and legal deposit legislation pertaining to each state mandates that publishers of any kind must deposit copies of their publications in the National Library of Australia as well as in the state or territory library in their jurisdiction. Until the 21st century, this has applied to all types of printed materials (and in some states, to audio-visual formats as well), and on 17 February 2016, the federal legal deposit provisions were extended to cover electronic publications of all types. By July 2018, while the Northern Territory was the only jurisdiction with legislation with explicit mention of "internet publications" (in its Publications (Legal Deposit) Act 2004), Queensland's Libraries Act 1988 and Tasmania's Libraries Act 1984 were broad enough to include digital publications. Most states and territories are as of 2020 reviewing or amending existing legislation to extend to digital publications as well.

Director-General of the NLA, Marie-Louise Ayres, stresses the importance of the legal deposit system as a way to capture the country's identity, where everything is captured impartially, and no selection or judgement of the content takes place.

Digital technologies created new challenges, but also an opportunity to facilitate legal deposit, by using specialised software to improve the deposit process, as well as the flow of other complex tasks involved in information retrieval, such as subject indexing, cataloguing and classification. NED provides a streamlined service to publishers, libraries and end users.

== Project description ==
With the surge in demand for all types of digital services in the 21st century, the National Library have used increasingly dwindling staff resources to develop services on their Trove platform and the NED service. The development and building of NED was a collaborative project to provide a single digital platform enabling the shared collection and preservation of and access to all Australian born-digital publications, with access to the public through the Trove website. Publishers deposit material via the NED website, and for most end-users, discovery is via Trove.

The core system was first developed in-house at the National Library by a team of business analysts, software developers and library staff, using PRINCE2 project management methodology. It uses open source software such as Drupal and Java. On 17 February 2016, the day the Copyright Act amendment for digital publications came into effect, the first ebook, Napoleon’s Last Island by Thomas Keneally was deposited by staff at Penguin Random House.

Nine libraries meant nine sets of technical requirements and legislation, which had to be accommodated while also balancing open access principles, the federal copyright legal requirements, security of the holdings, and other aspects. The steering group from the nine organisations met 100 times between 2017 and 2019, according to Kate Torney, CEO of State Library Victoria and Chair of NLSA. The National Library had had an edeposit service since early 2016, used by 2,500 Australian publishers. The new system was designed so that the National Library would host the NED service and be responsible for secure storage of deposited copies. As digital formats change, conversion would ensue while maintaining the integrity of the publications. State and territory libraries would have view-only access to commercial publications, disallowing downloads in any form, mirroring the conditions of access from within the National Library building, except where state or territory legislation mandates that a copy of a work must be located within that jurisdiction, in which case the file would be securely transferred to the member library (Northern Territory, South Australia and Victoria). Access conditions, however, would remain the same. The libraries would continue to purchase copies of publications for their patrons to borrow and use for reference purposes. Under the legislation (section 195CD (1) (c) (i)), publishers are required to deposit digital publications without Technological Protection Measures (TPM) or Digital Rights Management (DRM); that is, the copy must contain all content and functionality, without protection measures such as password protection or subscription paywalls.

Briefings on the service were presented at the VALA and Asia-Pacific Library and Information Conferences in 2018.

Online material is required to be provided to the relevant library or libraries if requested; if not available on a publicly accessible website, publishers can use NED to deposit the material. Along with PANDORA web archive service, NED effects digital deposit at the federal level; NED is designed to also include digital deposit at state and territory level.

Individual state libraries request publishers to fulfill their legal obligations by depositing their digital publications via the NED portal. Public access to the collection is available online through Trove, or from all national, state and territory libraries. Deposited items progress from the NED deposit portal through to Libraries Australia, Trove, WorldCat and all NSLA library catalogues.

The system was built over two years, after two years of scoping and planning. The nationwide service went live on 30 May 2019. All existing NLA edeposit content and most of the State Library of Queensland’s collection were migrated to the database prior to release, with the other libraries following suit soon afterwards.

NED was formally launched by the Minister for Communications, Cyber Safety and the Arts, Paul Fletcher, on 16 August 2019.

== Benefits and distinguishing features ==
Major benefits of NED include:

- a single service for publishers depositing material
- digital preservation and long‐term access to all content collected by collaborating libraries
- easier, faster access to legal deposit publications

NED is not the first electronic depository with one deposit point for a network of libraries; for example, the British Library's Publisher Submission Portal is similar. However, unlike the British Library and the German model at the Deutsche Nationalbibliothek, where public access is only available in the reading rooms in the libraries, among other constraints, NED allows for remote access by the general public for most of the content.

A number of other factors also contribute to its uniqueness:

- The nine partner libraries co-designed and co-invested in the project, mostly working across large distances.
- It provides a dedicated support service for libraries, publishers and users.
- It provides for legal deposit, management of the content, secure storage and preservation, and multiple access points
- Individual libraries are able to continue their relationships with publishers in their jurisdictions, and maintain their local identity, while providing a single standard interface for users.
- Publishers are able to provide their own metadata and specify the access conditions for their works, but member libraries are able to enhance the records.

Other benefits touted by project collaborators include ease of use for publishers, more content overall, and the enhanced ability to collect a wider sweep of material from culturally and linguistically diverse communities, including migrants and Indigenous Australians.

== Use and reception ==
Reactions from publishers was positive from the beginning: more than 50 items were deposited by publishers within the first 24 hours of its initial launch in May 2019.

Tim Coronel, manager of the Small Press Network, said that NED had made the process much easier and reduced the cost for small publishers, and that it would also help authors in the longer term, as their books would still be able to be found in the national collection even after it had gone out of print.

NED was a finalist in the "Excellence in multi-agency partnership award" category of the 2019 Australian Government Digital Awards (formerly ICT Awards).

== See also ==
- Australian Web Archive
- Digital library
- PANDORA Archive
- Trove
- Legal deposit
