= State Library Victoria =

State library in Melbourne, Victoria, Australia

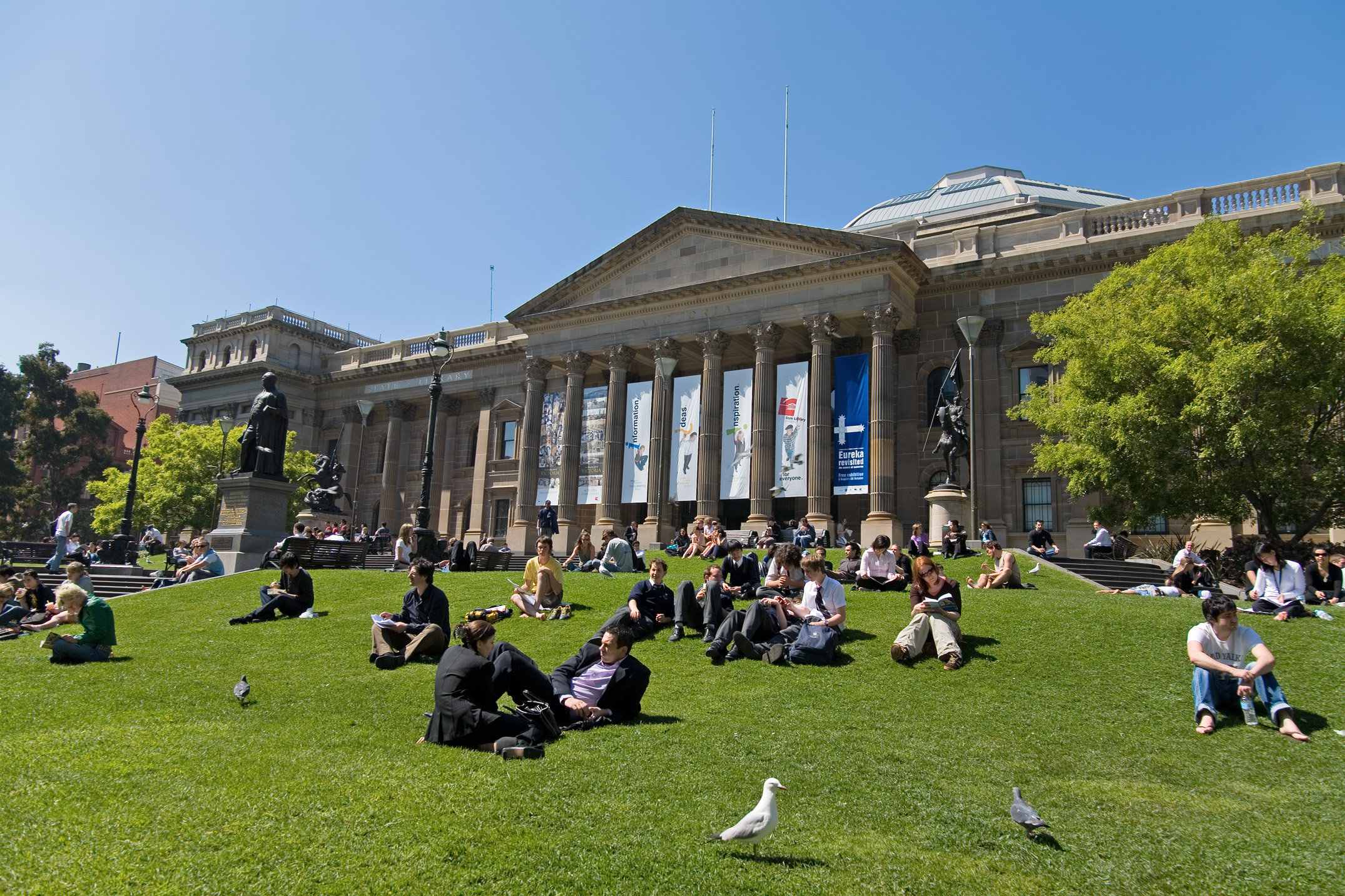
- State Library Victoria
- 37.809801°S 144.964787°E
- Location: Melbourne, Victoria, Australia
- Established: 1854; 172 years ago

Collection
- Size: 3,892,523 collection items electronically registered
- Legal deposit: Legal deposit library for the State of Victoria

Access and use
- Access requirements: Free to access
- Population served: 2,113,118
- Members: 87,073

Other information
- Employees: 311 FTE
- Public transit access: Melbourne Central, State Library Melbourne Central Station/Swanston St (#8): 1, 3, 5, 6, 16, 64, 67, 72 Melbourne Central & State Library stations/La Trobe St (#6): 30, 35,
- Website: slv.vic.gov.au

Victorian Heritage Register
- Official name: State Library of Victoria
- Type: State Registered Place
- Designated: 20 August 1982
- Reference no.: H1497
- Heritage Overlay number: HO751

State Library Victoria (SLV) is the state library of Victoria, Australia. Located in Melbourne, it was established in 1854 as the Melbourne Public Library, making it Australia's oldest public library and one of the first free libraries in the world. It is also Australia's busiest public library and, as of 2023, the third busiest library globally.

The library has remained on the same site in the central business district since it was established fronting Swanston Street, and over time has expanded to cover a block bounded also by La Trobe, Russell, and Little Lonsdale streets. The library's collection consists of over five million items, which in addition to books includes manuscripts, paintings, maps, photographs and newspapers, with a special focus on material from Victoria, including the diaries of the European founders of present-day Melbourne John Batman and John Pascoe Fawkner, the folios of colonial explorer James Cook, and items related to bushranger and outlaw Ned Kelly, notably his armour and the original Jerilderie Letter.

== History ==
=== 19th century ===
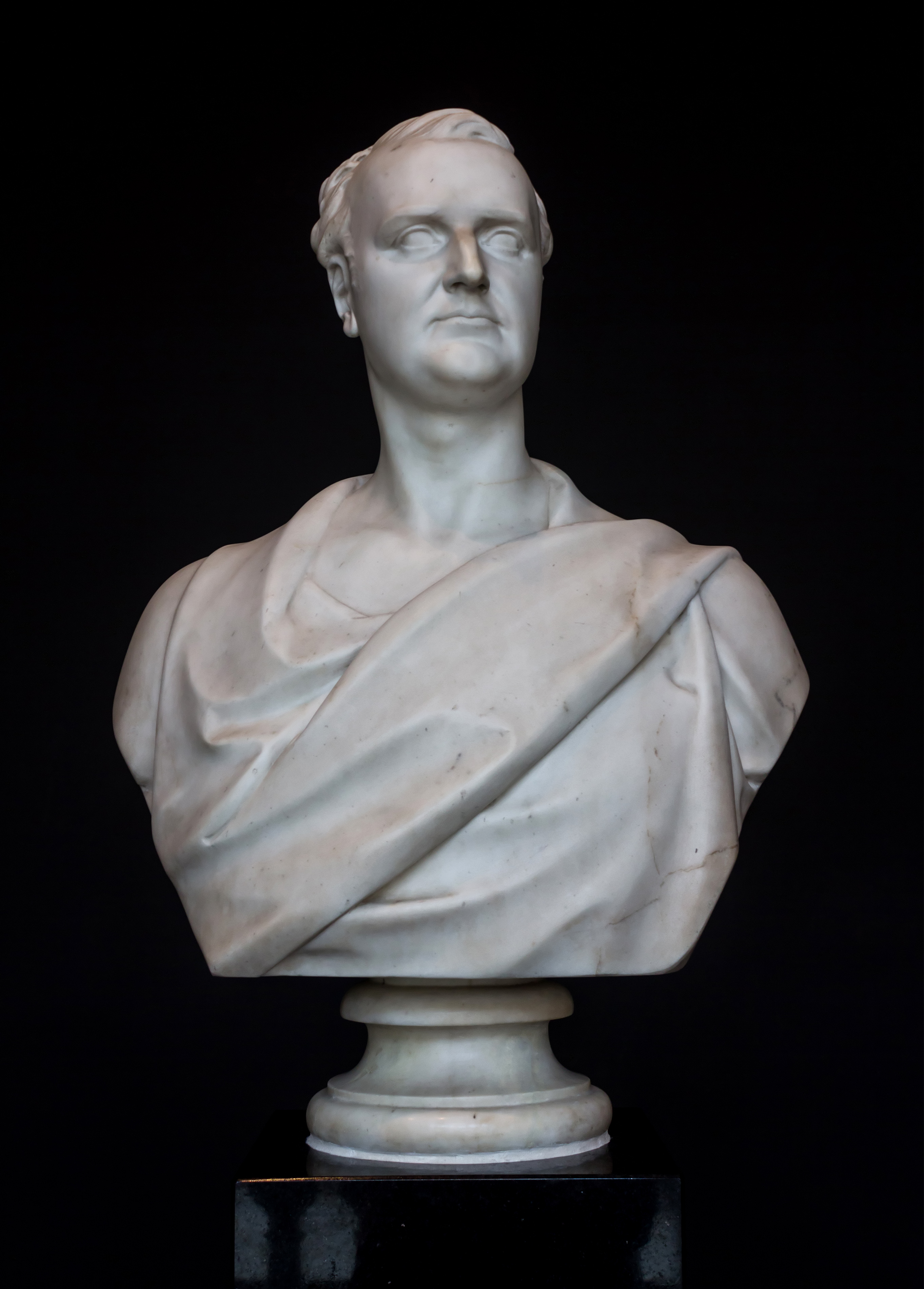
A bust of library founder Redmond Barry

In 1853, the decision to build a combined library, museum and gallery was made at the instigation of Governor of Victoria Charles La Trobe and Sir Redmond Barry. A competition was held, won by the recently arrived architect Joseph Reed, whose firm and its successors went on to design most of the later extensions, as well as numerous 19th-century landmarks such as the Melbourne Town Hall, and the Royal Exhibition Building.

On the same day of 3 July 1854, the recently inaugurated Governor Sir Charles Hotham laid the foundation stone of both the new library complex and the University of Melbourne. The library's first stage (the central part of the Swanston Street wing) opened on 11 February 1856, with a collection of 3,800 books chosen by Mr Justice Barry, the President of Trustees. Augustus H. Tulk, the first librarian, was appointed three months after the opening. The Melbourne Public Library as it was then known was one of the first free public libraries in the world, open to anyone over 14 years of age, so long as they had clean hands.

The complex of buildings that now house the Library was built in numerous stages, housing various library spaces, art galleries and museum displays, finally filling the entire block in 1992. In 1860 Joseph Reed designed a grand complex for the whole block including a domed section facing Russell Street to House the Museum and Gallery, painting a broad canvas that was more or less followed over the next century.

The next stage was the south part of the front wing, opened in 1859, including the elaborate first floor Queen's Reading Room (now Queen's Hall). The northern part (now Hansen Hall) was added complete in 1864 by Abraham Linacre, but the classical portico was not built until 1870.

A number of temporary halls and a pagoda were built in 1866 for the Intercolonial Exhibition of Australasia just behind the front wing. From 1870, some of these housed the Industrial & Technological Museum of Victoria (I&T Museum). That year, author, journalist and bohemian figure Marcus Clarke joined the library staff, serving as sub-librarian from 1874 until his death in 1881.

The Library Museums and National Gallery Act 1869 formed a single body to run the Public Library of Victoria, National Gallery of Victoria (NGV), National Museum of Victoria, and the then embryotic I&T Museum.

In 1875 the McArthur Gallery was built to house the NGV.

Barry Hall, along Little Lonsdale Street, was built in 1886. This now houses the Wheeler Centre. In 1887, the Buvelot Gallery opened for the NGV, (the gallery was later known as Swinburne Hall). It now houses the Arts Reading Room.

1892 saw extensive expansion on the site. In that year, what is now the Cowen Gallery (was Stawell Gallery) and Victoria Gallery (was La Trobe Gallery) opened for NGV use. The Lending Library opened. And what is now the Redmond Barry Reading Room was built to house the I&T Museum. In 1899, this was taken over by the National Museum, which renamed it McCoy Hall after Frederick McCoy, its first director. The I&T Museum was put into storage.

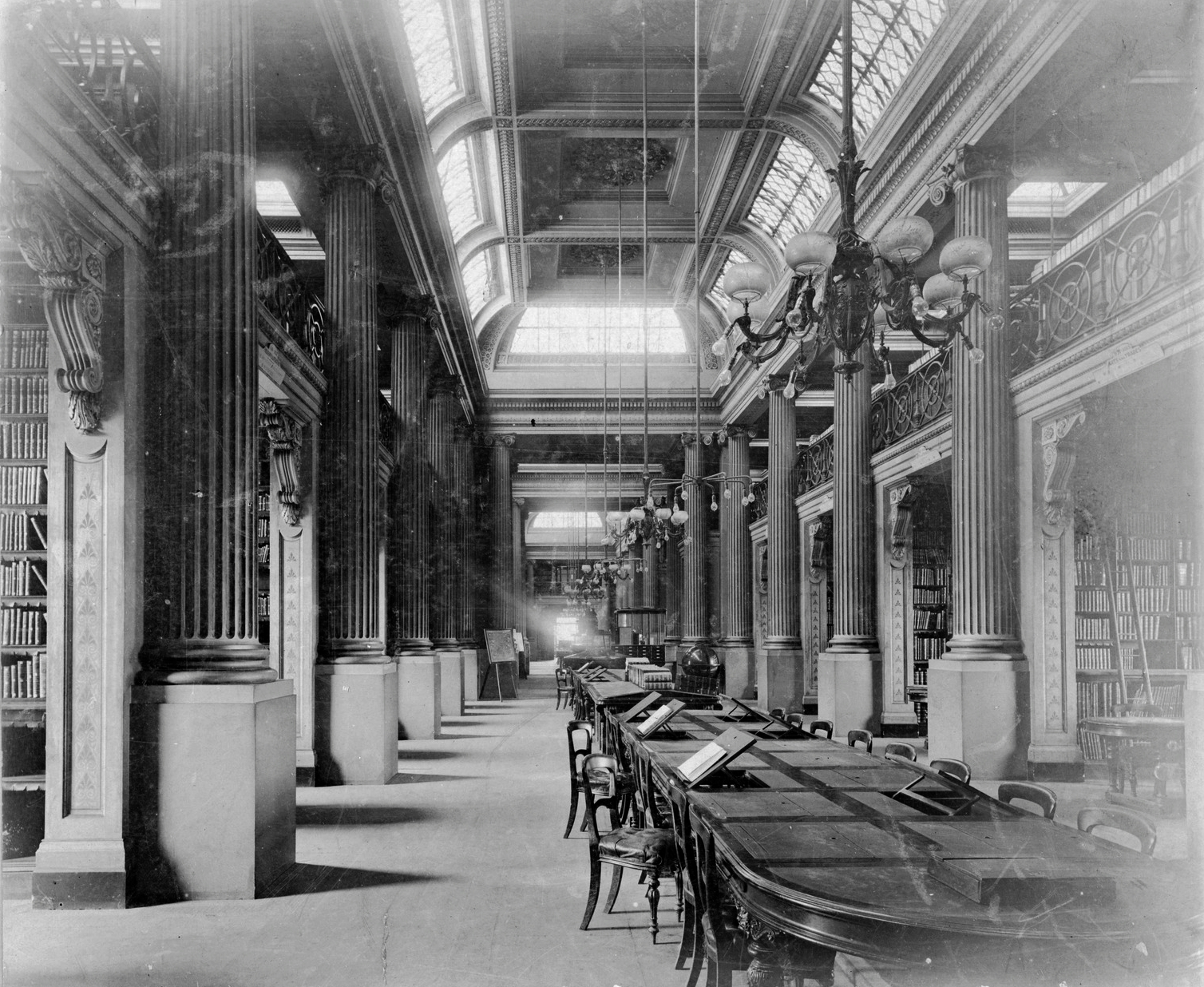
The Ian Potter Queen's Hall, the library's first reading room, opened in 1856. Today it houses Australian literature and also hosts events.

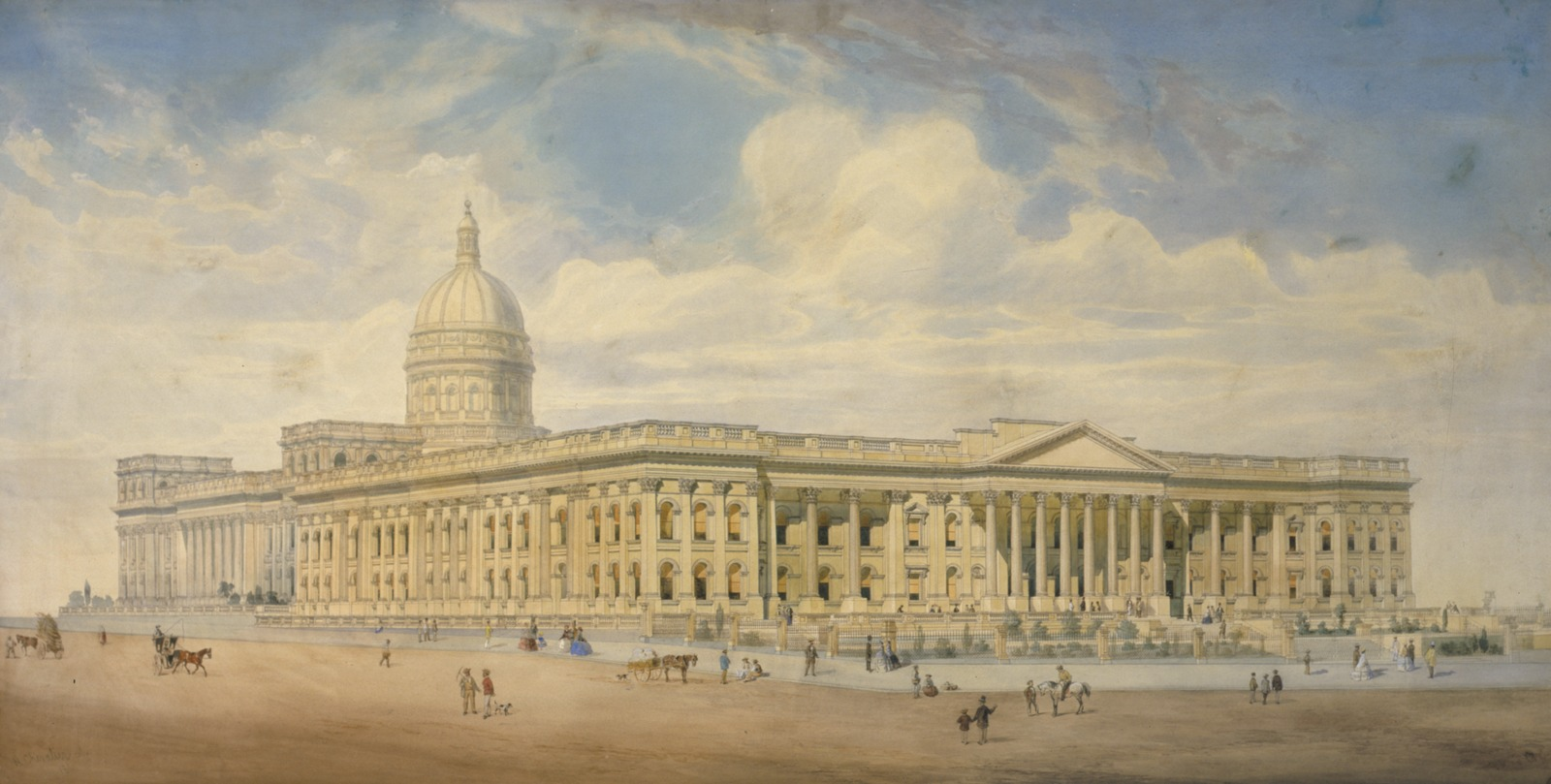
Joseph Reed's masterplan for the Library, Museum and Gallery, illustrated in 1860 by Nicholas Chevalier

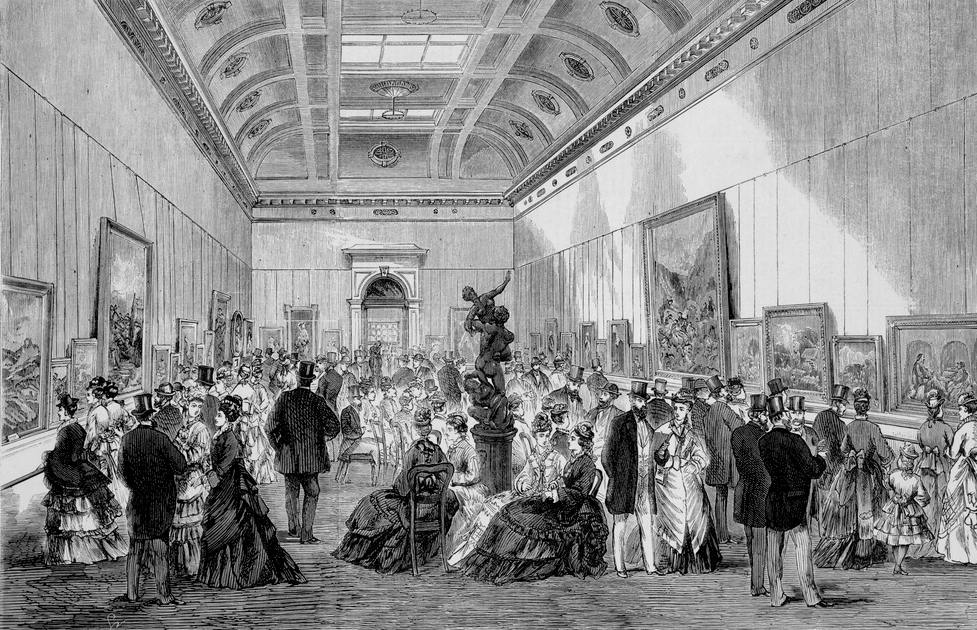
The McArthur Gallery, pictured during its opening in 1875, was the National Gallery of Victoria's first purpose-built room. It is now the Newspaper & Family History Reading Room.

=== 20th century ===
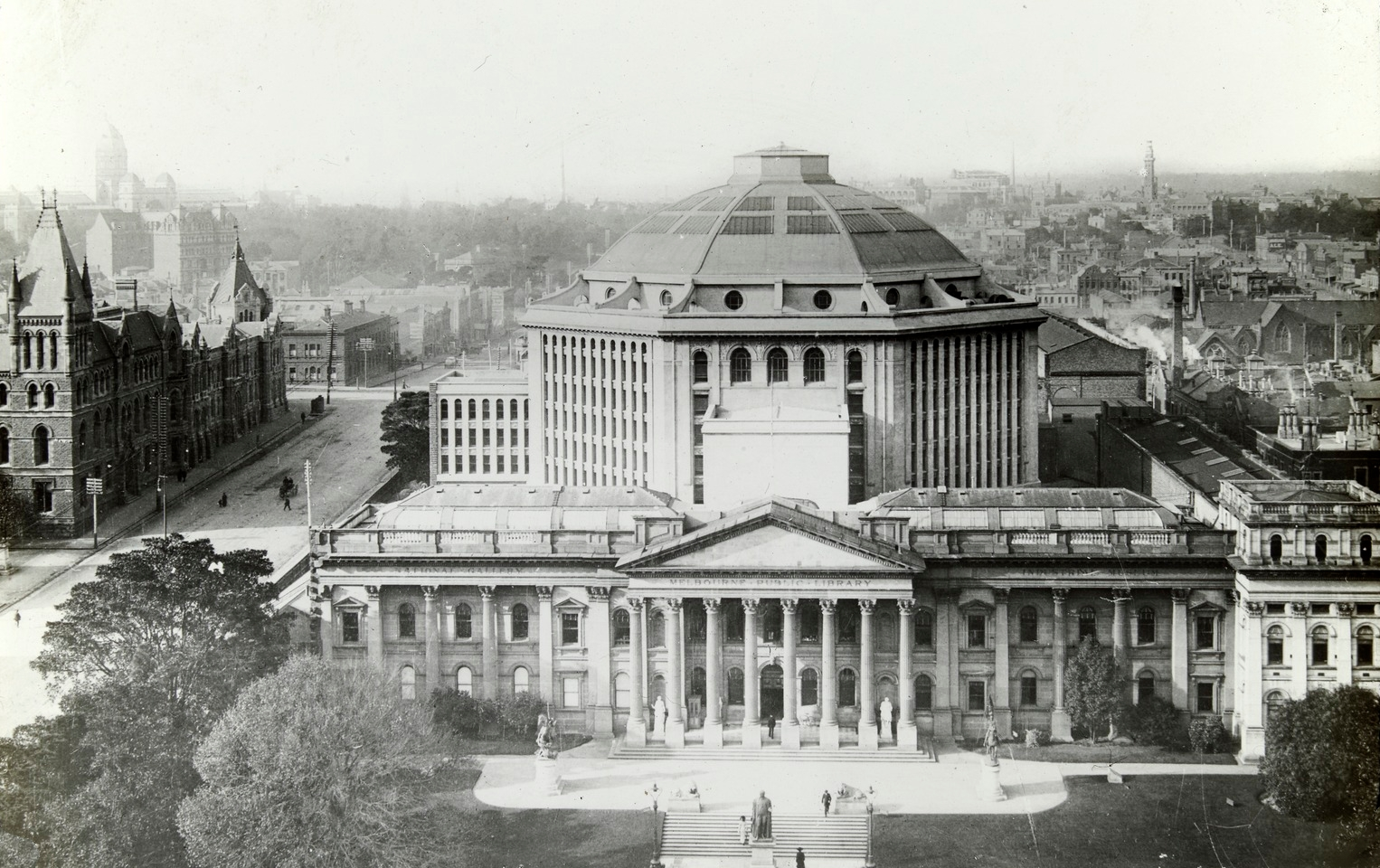
Aerial view showing the Domed Reading Room, commissioned in 1909 to celebrate the library's jubilee

In 1909, most of the remaining Intercolonial Exhibition buildings were closed and the Great Hall was demolished. On part of the land they occupied, Baldwin Spencer Hall was built (now the "Russell Street Welcome Zone"), and work began on the library's famed Domed Reading Room. Opened in 1913, it was designed by Bates, Peebles and Smart, the successor to Joseph Reed's firm, now known as Bates Smart. Its construction led to much less use of Queen's Hall, which led to it becoming the home of a reborn I&T Museum in 1915. The reading room was refurbished and reopened in 2003 as the La Trobe Reading Room, with the dome's skylights that had been hidden behind copper sheathing since 1959 again revealed.

In 1928 the South Rotunda opened. The McAllan Gallery on the LaTrobe Street side was built in 1932. In 1940, the North Rotunda opened.

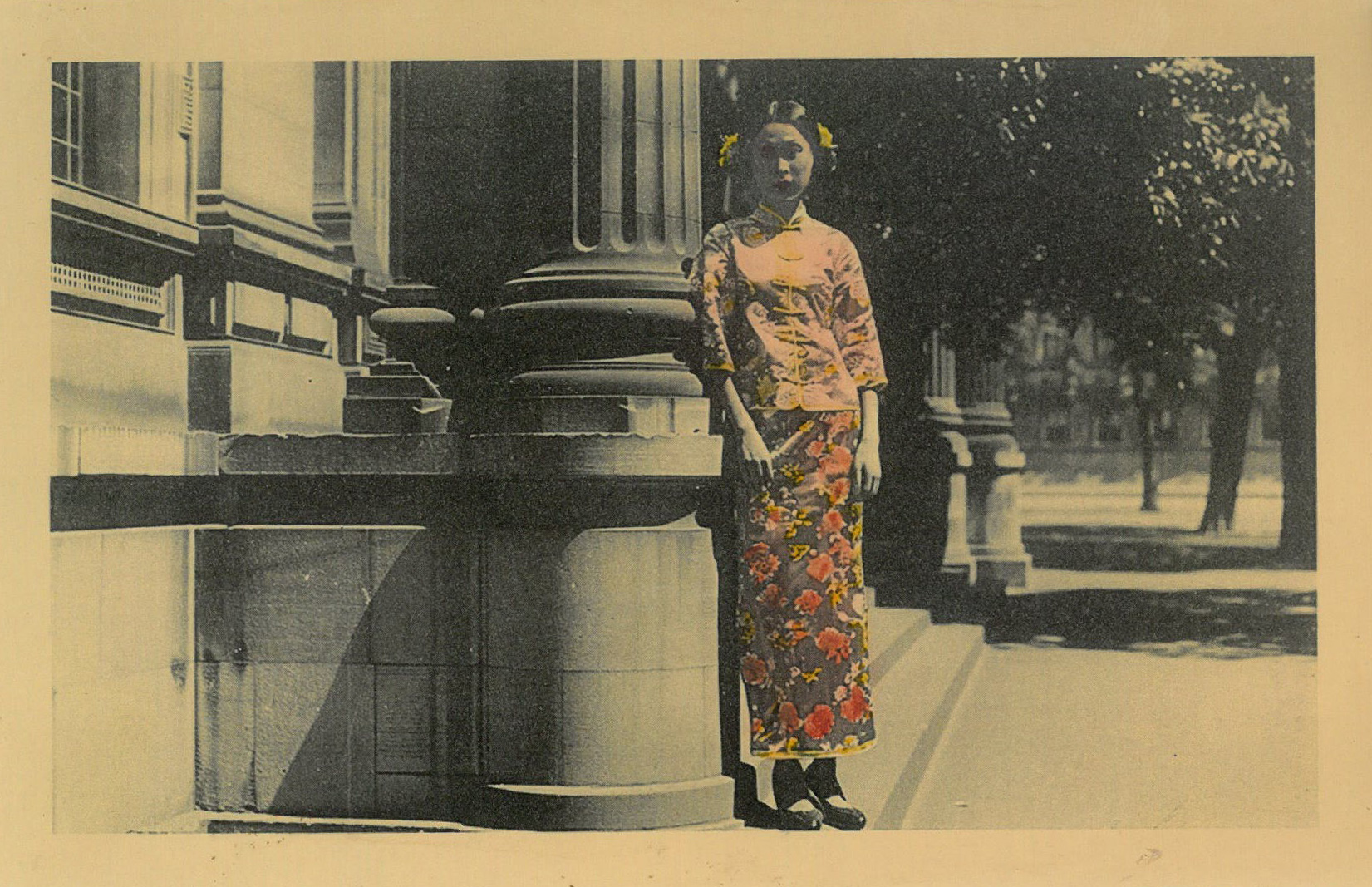
A handcoloured photo of a woman wearing traditional Chinese clothing standing next to the State Library of Victoria, c. 1920s

The Public Library, National Gallery and Museums Act 1944 organisationally separated the four major cultural institutions, while they continued to share the one site.

In 1959, the dome's skylights were covered in copper sheets due to water leakage, creating the dim atmosphere that characterised the Library for decades.

In 1963, the south-west courtyard next to the dome became a planetarium. (This space is now the Pauline Gandel Children's Quarter.)

In 1965, the La Trobe Library was opened to house the Library's Australiana collections. This building later became the Conference Centre and Theatrette.

The National Gallery of Victoria (NGV) moved to a new home in St Kilda Road in 1968. This led to the I&T Museum moving out of Queen's Hall and into the NGV's buildings. Queen's Hall returned to Library use.

In 1971 the Lending Library closed. Melbourne's CBD was to be without a public lending library until the opening of the City Library in 2004.

Public Record Office Victoria was once the Archives Department of the Library. In 1973 the Public Records Act established the Public Record Office as the state's archive authority, independent of the Library. The Office moved to Laverton in 1977, then to North Melbourne in 2004. PROV now frequently supplies exhibits for the Old Treasury Building museum.

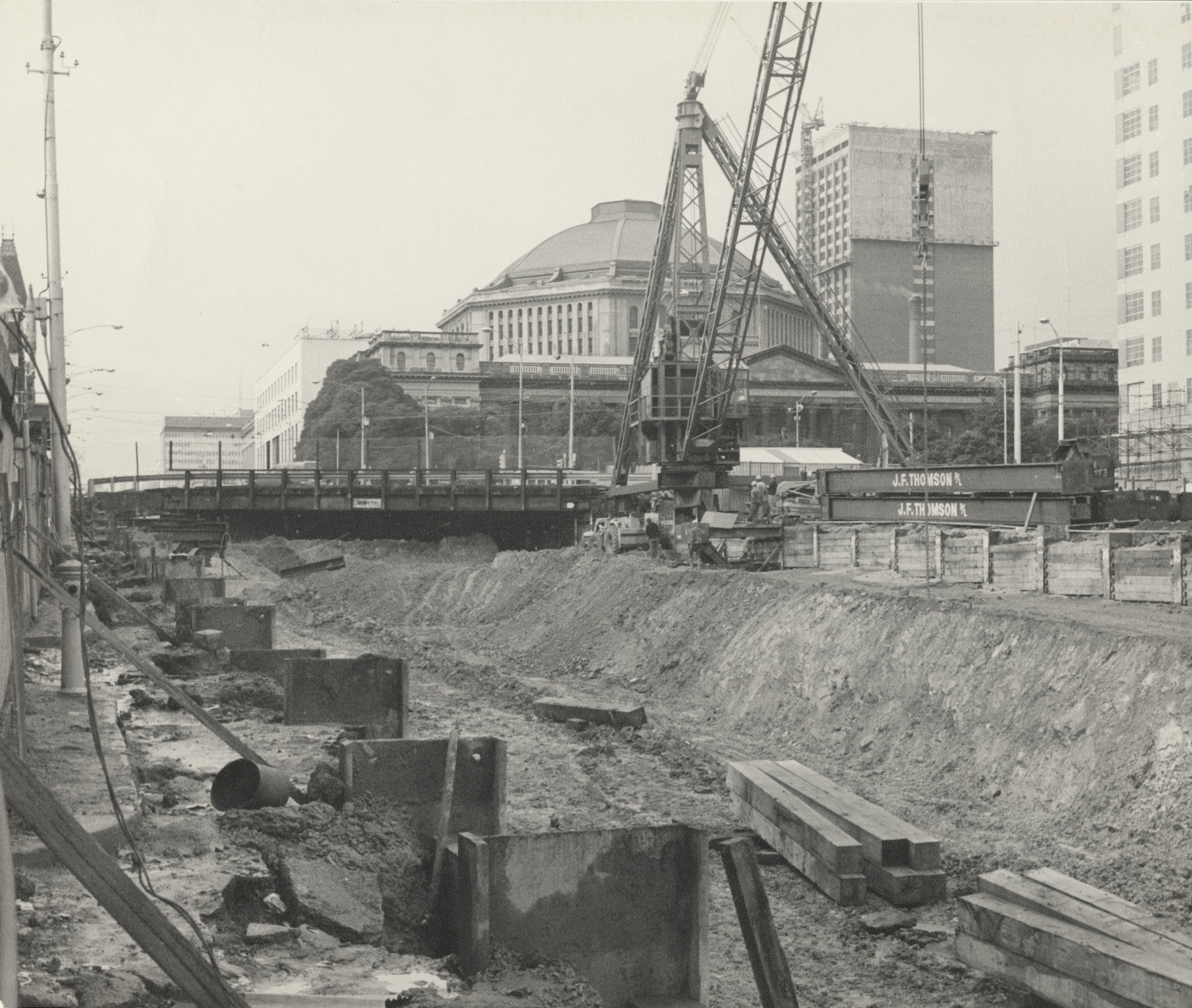
Construction of Museum station, now Melbourne Central, under La Trobe Street in 1974, with the library visible in the background

In 1973, construction began on Museum station (now Melbourne Central station), which, upon completion in 1981, provided direct heavy rail access to the State Library for the first time. The National Museum and what was now known as the Science Museum of Victoria merged in 1983 to form the Museum of Victoria, filling the Russell St end of the site. Part of this combined museum was moved to Spotswood to form Scienceworks in 1992, with the bulk of the galleries remaining until 1997. At that time the remaining museum closed temporarily before part reopened elsewhere as the Immigration Museum in 1998, and the rest as the Melbourne Museum in 2000.

The Library underwent major refurbishments between 1990 and 2004, designed by architects Ancher Mortlock & Woolley. The project cost approximately A$200 million.

In 1995, the north-west courtyard next to the dome was glassed in to become a reading room (and later the Genealogy Centre, and now the Conversation Quarter). In 1998, the north-east courtyard was glassed in to become the Newspaper Reading Room (and is now the Ideas Quarter).

The NGV returned to the Library building from 1999 to 2002, occupying the Russell Street halls while its St Kilda Road buildings were renovated.

The reading room closed in 1999 to allow for renovation, when the skylights were reinstated.

By the late 1990s, on Sundays between 2.30 pm and 5.30 pm, a speakers' forum took place on the library forecourt. Orators took turns in speaking on various subjects, and it was a popular location for protest meetings and a rallying point for marches.

=== 21st century ===
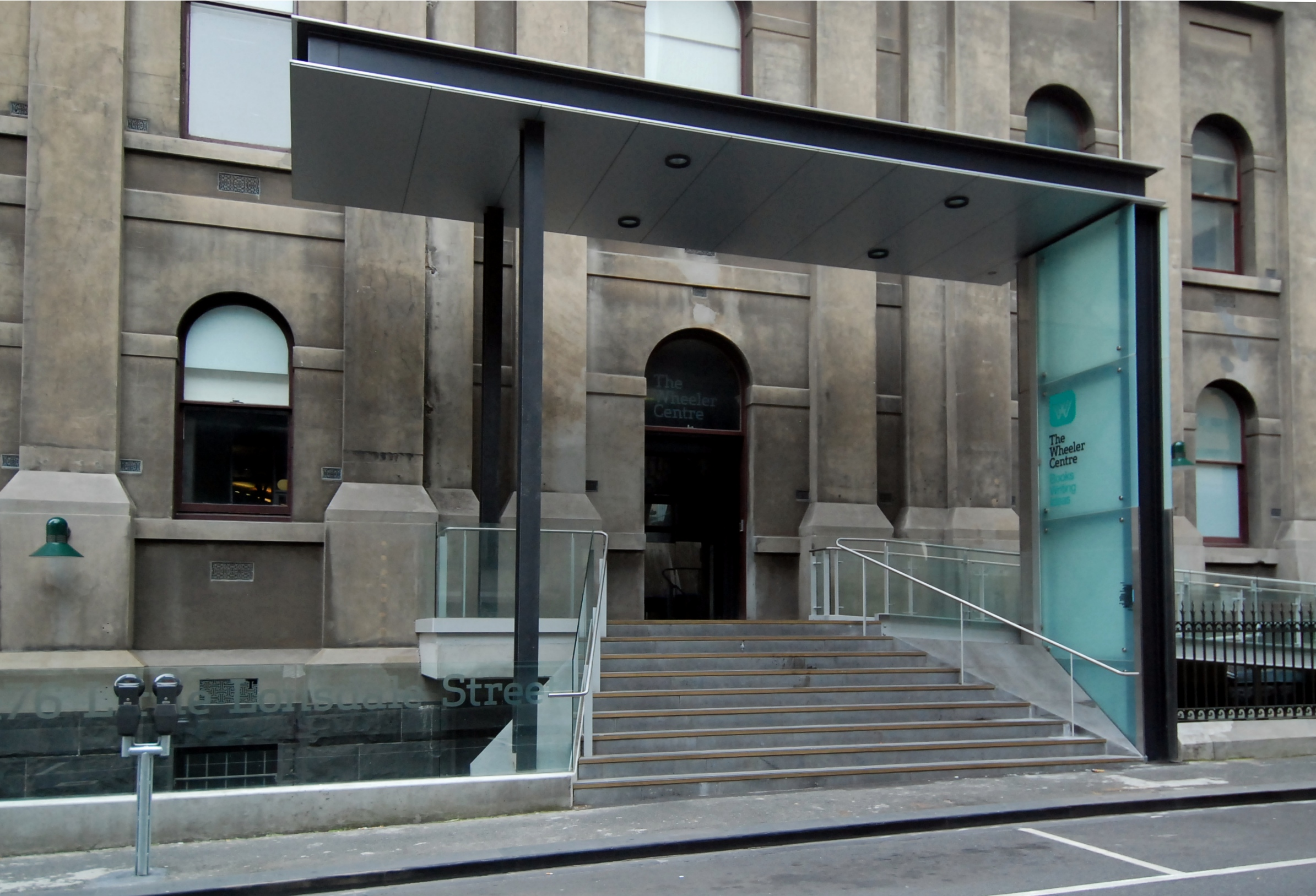
Entrance to the Wheeler Centre on Little Lonsdale Street

A building redevelopment included the creation of a number of exhibition spaces which opened between 2001 and 2003. Some of these are used to house permanent exhibitions The Mirror of the World: Books and Ideas and The Changing Face of Victoria, as well as a display from the Pictures Collection in the Cowen Gallery. As a result of the redevelopment, State Library Victoria could now be considered one of the largest exhibiting libraries in the world.

The now renamed La Trobe Reading Room reopened in 2003. Also in 2003, the final dome-side courtyards were enclosed and became the Arts Reading Room (now the Create Quarter) and Experimedia (now Pauline Gandell Children's Quarter).

In February 2010, the southern wing of the library building on Little Lonsdale Street was reopened as the Wheeler Centre, part of Melbourne's city of literature initiative.

In 2015 the Library embarked on a five-year, A$88.1 million redevelopment project, Vision 2020, to transform its public spaces, programs and facilities to better meet the changing needs of the community. On 29 April 2015 the Minister for Creative Industries Martin Foley announced that the 2015–16 State Budget would provide A$55.4 million towards the redevelopment of State Library Victoria, including the restoration of the Queen's Hall, the creation of a rooftop garden terrace, a dedicated children's and youth space, and the opening up 40 per cent more of the building to the public. In late 2017, the library's contribution of A$27 million from donations was eventually raised. In September 2018, the main Swanston Street entrance was temporarily closed and replaced by the newly refurbished Russell Street and La Trobe Street entrances.

In December 2019 the Library officially completed its Vision 2020 redevelopment project. A huge amount of space left vacant for nearly 20 years was again open to the public.

In 2024, the Library faced controversy for canceling online writing workshops aimed at teenagers, reportedly due to the host authors' pro-Palestine views in the Israel-Gaza war, despite the official reason being a "child and cultural safety review".

== Forecourt ==
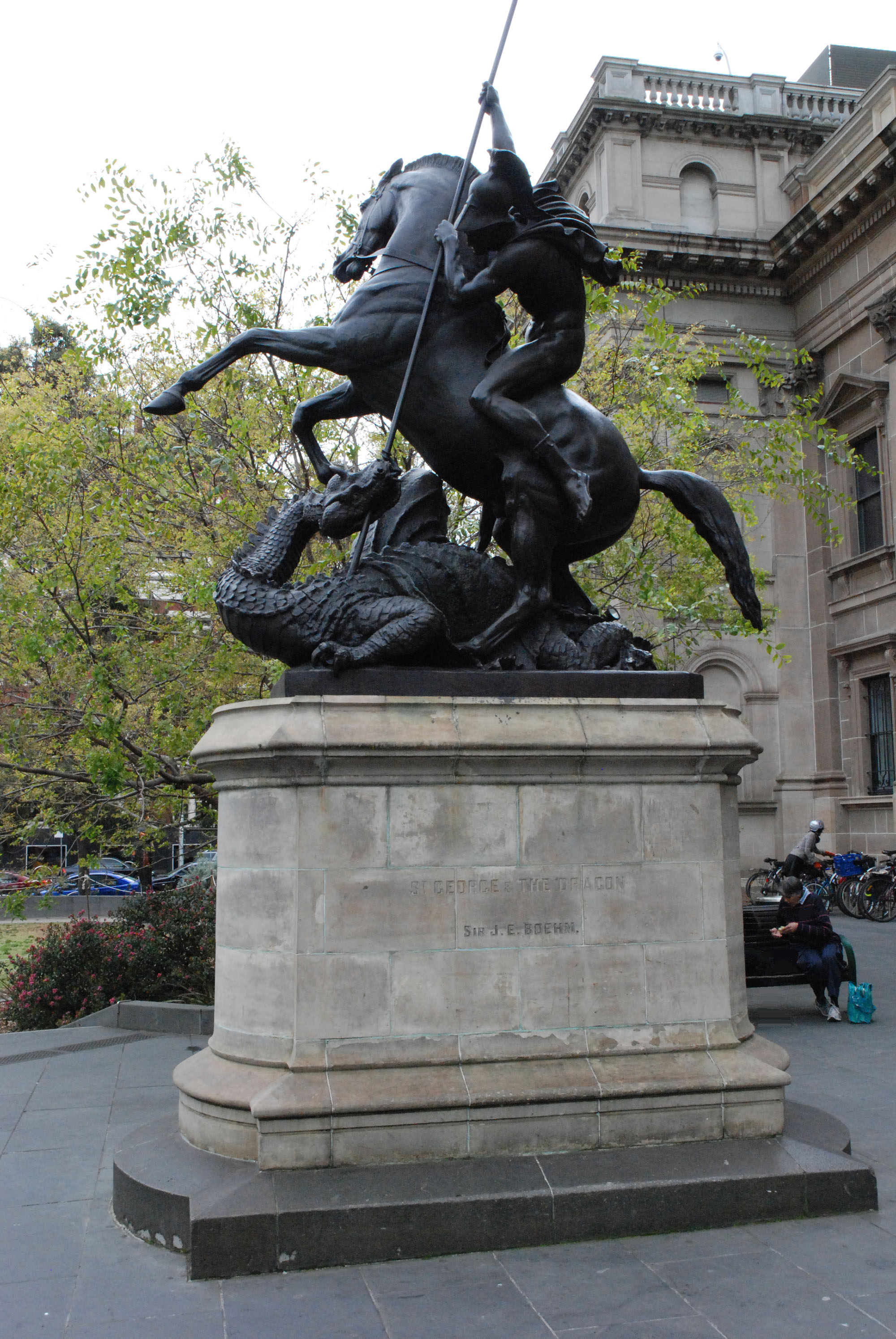
Sir Joseph Edgar Boehm's Saint George Slaying the Dragon (1889), one of several statues in the forecourt

The grassy lawn in front of the library's grand entrance on Swanston Street is a popular lunch-spot for the city's workers and students at the adjacent RMIT University. Originally enclosed by a picket fence, then by a wrought iron fence and gates in the 1870s, the space was opened up with the removal of the fence and the creation of diagonal paths in 1939.

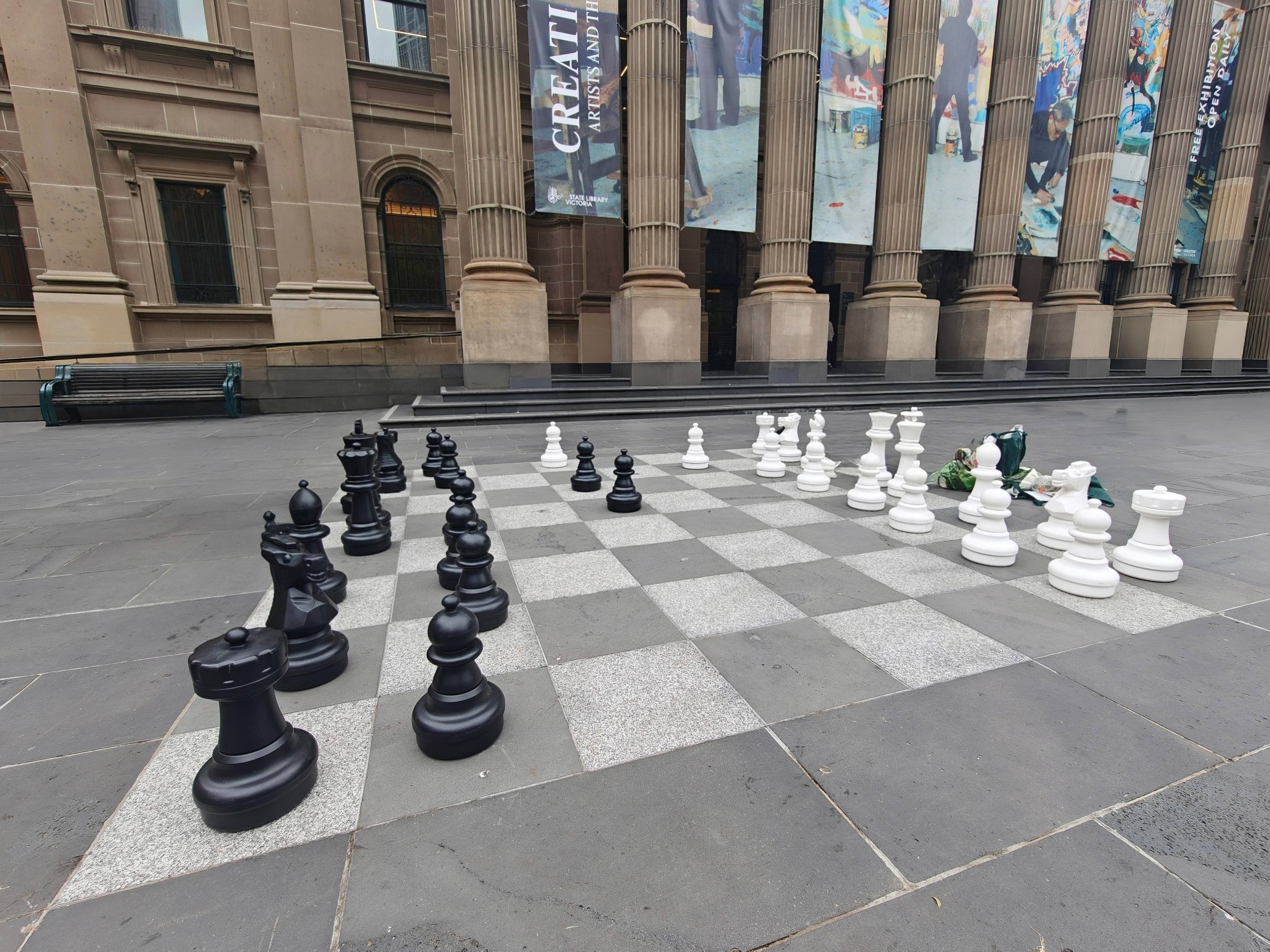
One of the forecourt's large chessboards

The forecourt includes a number of statues. A pair of bronze lions flanked the entry from the 1860s until they were removed in 1937 due to deterioration. A memorial statue of Sir Redmond Barry, Q.C., by James Gilbert and built by Percival Ball was installed on the central landing of the main stairs in 1887. Flanking the entrance plaza are Saint George and the Dragon, by the English sculptor Sir Joseph Edgar Boehm, installed in 1889 and Jeanne d'Arc (Joan of Arc), a replica of the statue by French sculptor Emmanuel Frémiet, installed in 1907. World War I commemorative statues 'Wipers' and 'The Driver' were at the centre points of the 1939 diagonal paths, but were relocated to the ground of the Shrine of Remembrance in 1998. A statue of Charles La Trobe, by Australian sculptor Peter Corlett, was installed in 2006 in the north east corner of the lawn.

In 2012, the Dromkeen Foundation and Scholastic Australia gifted the entire Dromkeen Collection, along with the Dromkeen archive, to State Library Victoria. The collection includes a number of sculptures featuring children's book characters that are installed in the Library forecourt.

The forecourt is often used for rallies and protests.

== Reading rooms and other spaces ==
=== The dome (La Trobe Reading Room and Dome Gallery) ===
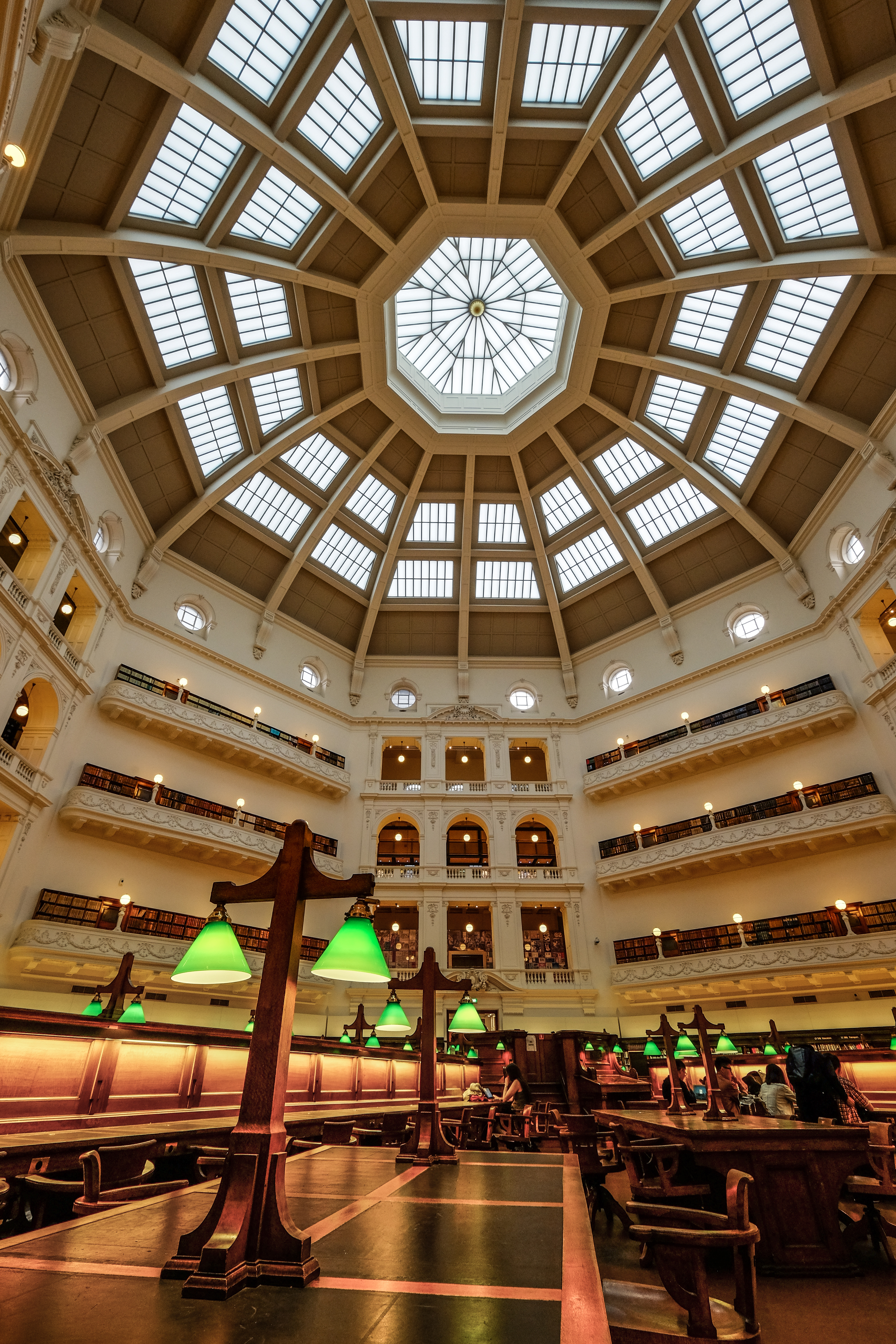
The La Trobe Reading Room

The landmark Domed Reading Room was opened in 1913, and was designed by Norman G. Peebles of Bates Smart. Its six storey high octagonal space was designed to hold over a million books and up to 600 readers; as of 2024 it can house 32,000 books and 320 readers at its desks. It is 34.75 metres in both diameter and height, and its oculus is nearly 5 metres wide. The dome was the largest in the world on completion.

In 2003, the area under the dome was officially renamed the La Trobe Reading Room, and now houses the Library's Australiana collection, previously held in the 1965 La Trobe Building. The Dome Gallery in Level 4 houses the free permanent exhibition "World of the book". Level 5 housed the long-running exhibition "The changing face of Victoria" until its closure on 6 February 2022. Level 6 provides visitors with a view of the reading room below.

The dome is also home to the Victorian Indigenous Research Centre.

=== The Ian Potter Queen's Hall ===
The central portion of the Ian Potter Queen's Hall opened in 1856 as the Library's original reading room, above the ground floor rooms below. After the opening of the larger Domed Reading Room in 1913, it was less used. In 1915, it became the home of the Industrial and Technological Museum, which remained here until 1969. It became a reading room of the Library again at this time. It closed to the public in 2003 due to disrepair before being renovated and reopening in 2019 as a mixed-use study space containing Victorian young adult literature. After hours, the Ian Potter Queen's Hall functions as a special events venue.

=== Redmond Barry Reading Room ===
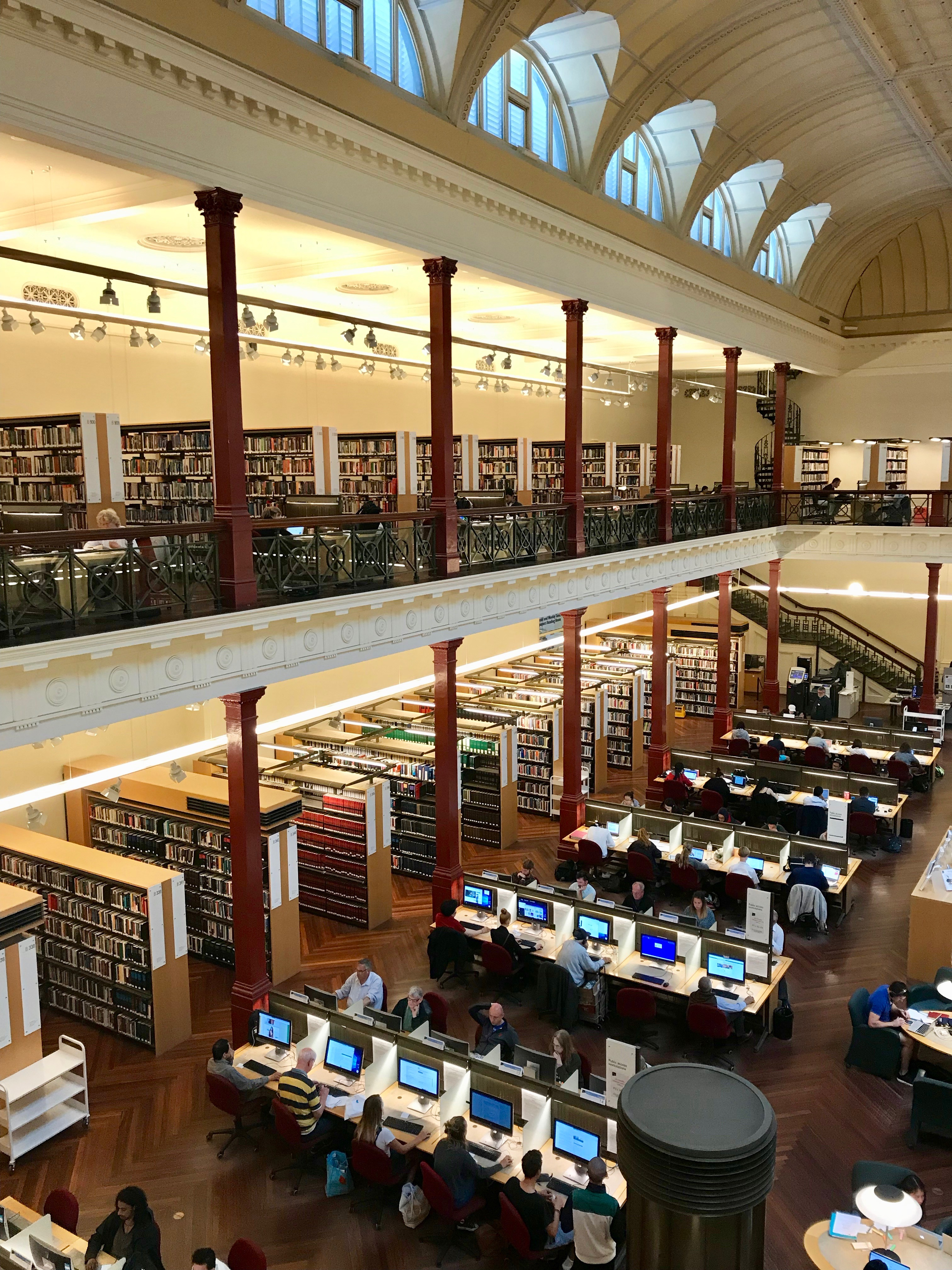
The Redmond Barry Reading Room

Located at the eastern end of the library, the Redmond Barry Reading Room is home to the library's contemporary collection of books, magazines and periodicals with the mezzanine housing folio-size books and providing additional independent study desks. It was built in 1893 as the home for the Industrial and Technological Museum. It became home to the National Museum of Victoria (now Melbourne Museum) from 1899 to 1997, and was known as McCoy Hall during this time.

=== Heritage Collections Reading Room ===
This closed-access reading room provides a space to view heritage collection materials. There are 14 historical pendant lamps hanging off the ceiling and a detailed ceramic embossed wall and ceiling. Map bags are the only collection of materials held in HCRR and consist of copies of maps of metropolitan Melbourne between the 1800s to 1900s and can be viewed without appointment, for all other collections entry to the Heritage Collections Reading Room is by appointment only.

=== Arts Reading Room ===
The library maintains an extensive collection of books, periodicals, recordings and other materials pertaining to art, music and the performing arts. The Arts Reading Room is located beside the Newspaper and Family History Reading Room at the eastern end of the building, and contains workspaces for quiet study and AV equipment for providing access to the library's vast array of AV resources.

=== Newspaper and Family History Reading Rooms ===
Relocated beside the Redmond Barry Reading room in 2018, this room contains a comprehensive collection of Victorian newspaper titles on microfilm, as well as some interstate titles. Modern microfilm machines enable patrons to save images of newspapers to USB memory stick. Physical copies of current Victorian newspapers are available for use, with three months' worth stored onsite. Services related to family history include a vast collection of microfilm and microfiche, printed references, databases and biographies. Research tools for newspaper and family history research include computers, printers and scanners, with a specialist librarian available for reference inquiries. For many years this room was known as the McArthur Gallery.

=== Other spaces ===
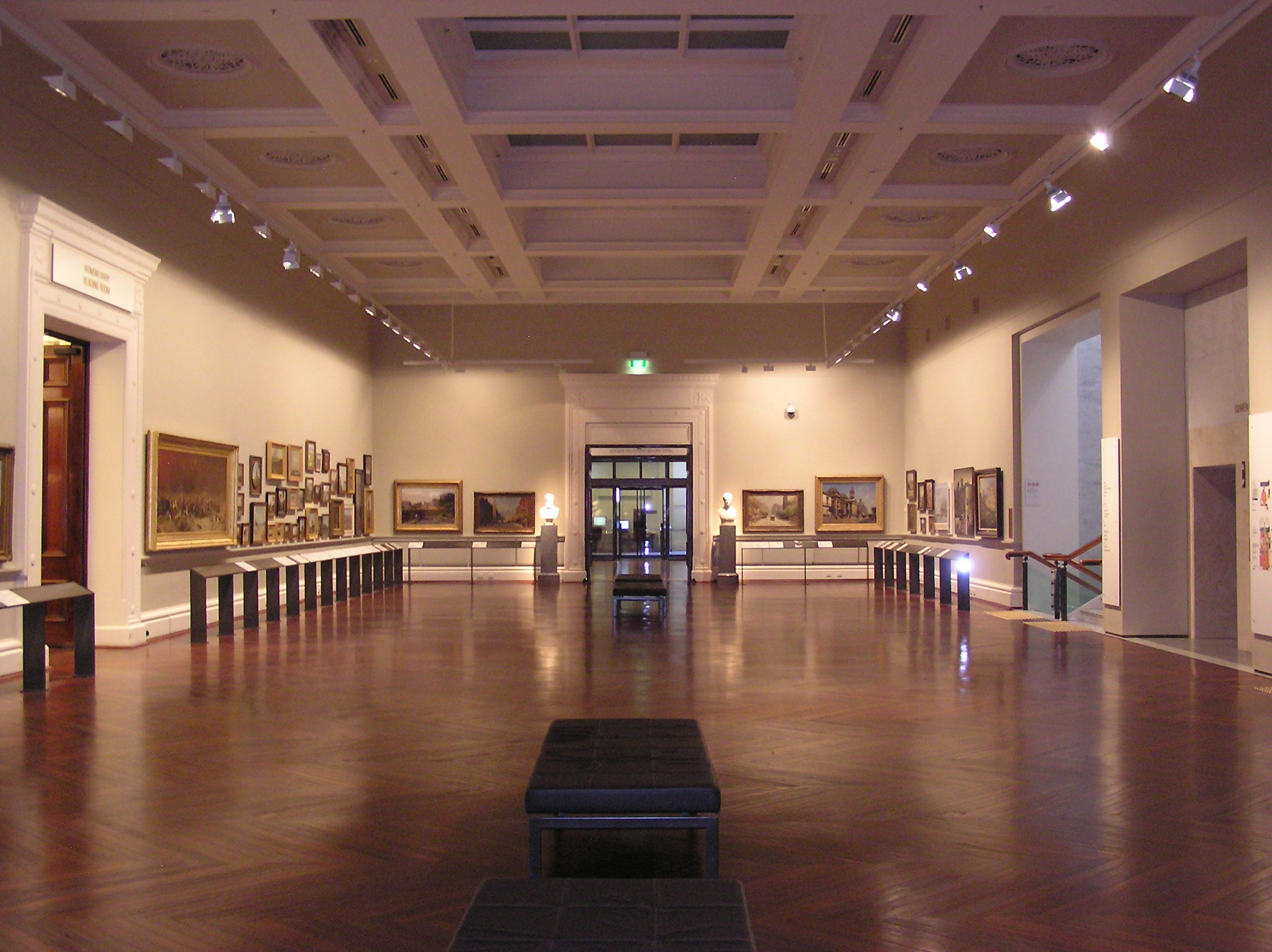
Cowen Gallery

Other public spaces include the Swanston Street Welcome Zone, The Quad (including StartSpace, Conversation Quarter, Create Quarter, Ideas Quarter and Pauline Gandel Children's Quarter), Isabella Fraser Room, Cowen Gallery (formerly Stawell Gallery), South Rotunda, North Rotunda, Conference Centre, Village Roadshow Theatrette, Keith Murdoch Gallery, Hansen Hall, Victoria Gallery and Russell Street Welcome Zone. The building also contains the Wheeler Centre, which is open to the public.

== Collections and services ==
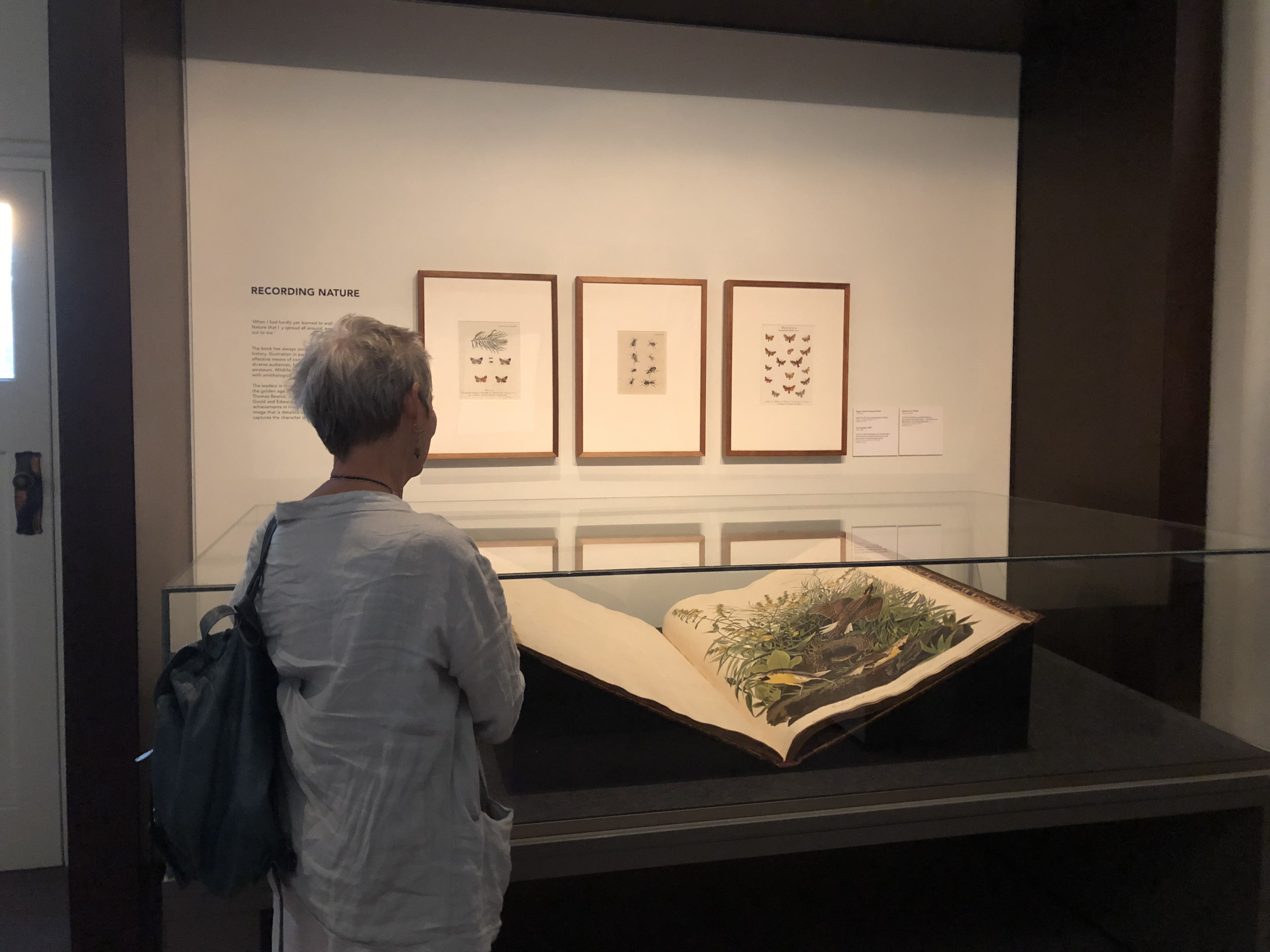
John James Audubon's The Birds of America (1827–38), a highlight of the library's Rare Books collection

=== Exhibitions ===
The Library has a permanent exhibition, World of the Book. The exhibition features more than 300 rare, remarkable, historically significant items in the State Collection, celebrating the unique place books have in our culture. The Library also mounts special exhibitions of the Library collection and of international loans. 2022-23's The Rest Is Up To You: Melbourne Fringe Festival 1982-2042 was the Library's most popular exhibition on record. It was co-curated with the Melbourne Fringe Festival and featured innovative display of oral history recordings about the festival in celebration of its 40th anniversary, as well as items from the Melbourne Fringe archive held by the Library. In 2023, MIRROR: New views on photography was the first exhibition at an Australian cultural institution to embed sign language throughout. The exhibition showcases over 140 photographs from the State Collection, alongside creative responses from emerging and established Victorian storytellers. In October 2023, the Library opened Luminous: A thousand years of Hebrew manuscripts. This is the third in a series of exhibitions at the Library featuring major international loans and about the significance of books and the written word to various cultures. Luminous follows The Medieval Imagination in 2008, which looked at European manuscripts, and 2012's Love and Devotion, which focused on Persian manuscripts.

The Library's first born-digital exhibition was launched in 2023. Beyond the Book: A journey through the Treasures of the Emmerson Collection used state-of-the-art photogrammetry techniques to digitally capture rare books about the English Civil War in extreme detail. The exhibition was the result of an Australian Research Council linkage project. The Library worked with the Australian National University, the University of Newcastle and the Victoria University of Wellington.

=== Events ===
The Library's contemporary and heritage spaces are often used for major cultural events, such as Melbourne Writers Festival, Melbourne Fashion Week, Art After Dark, Blak & Bright Literary Festival and YIRRAMBOI.

=== Ask a Librarian ===
State Library Victoria offers a free reference enquiry service called Ask a Librarian. Onsite and online visitors to the Library can seek help with research questions including family history research.

=== eResources ===
Many of the library's eResources are available from home to any Victorian registered as a State Library Access member. Databases include multi-subject magazine and journal article databases; newspaper archives of most major Australian and international papers; and specialist subject databases. There are thousands of eBooks in the Library's collection.

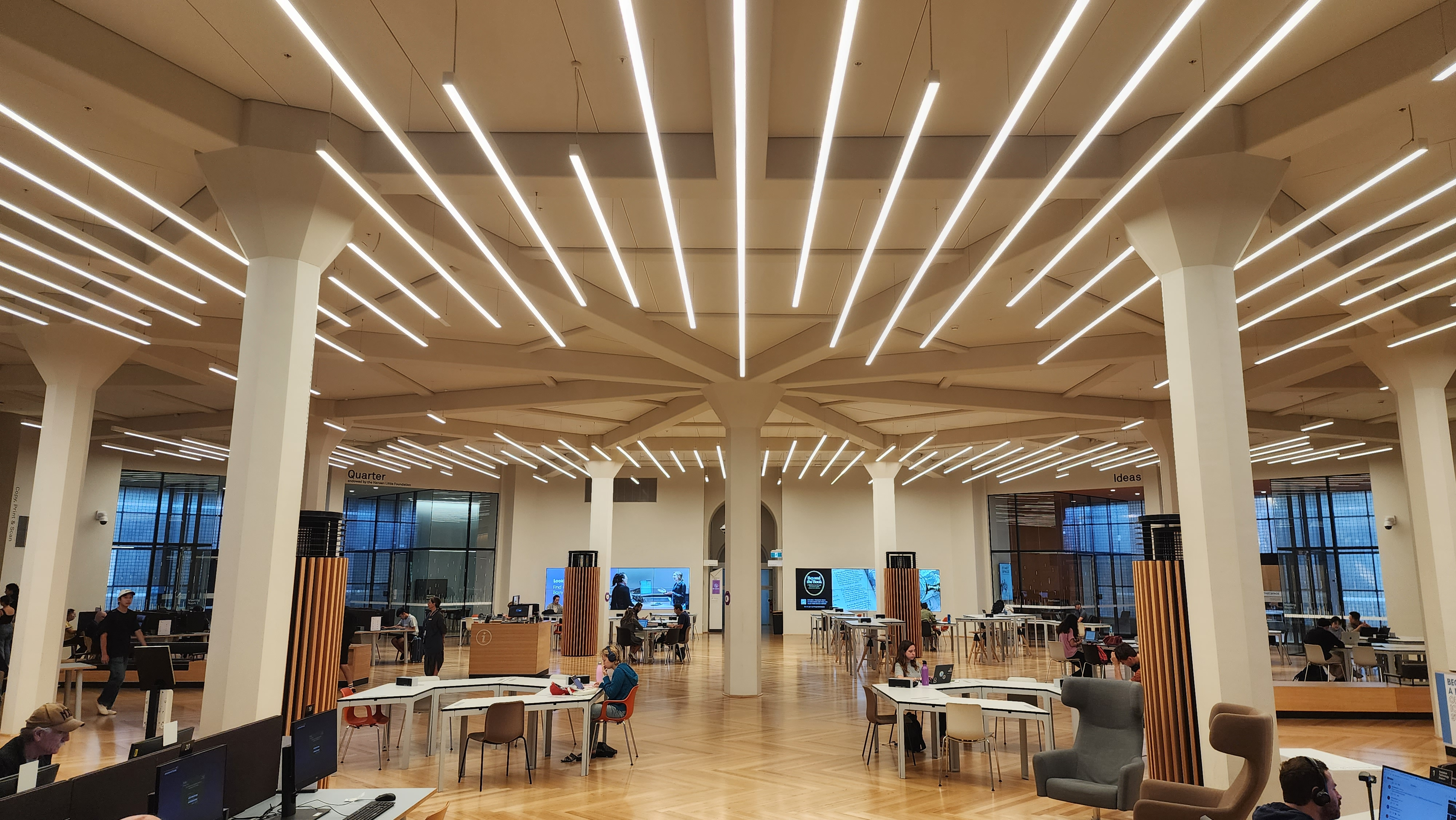
The Quad is located in the ground floor of the library.

=== Photographs ===
The library's collection numbers 1,253,543 photographs. These have been subject to an extensive digitising program. Out-of-copyright images, that do not have cultural sensitivities, are made available as freely downloadable TIF format.

=== The La Trobe Journal ===
This publication was founded by the Friends of State Library Victoria in 1968 to promote interest in the Library's Australiana collection (then housed in the "La Trobe Library"). In 1998, the State Library Victoria Foundation became the sponsor of the journal, enabling the publication to expand considerably. From 2014 the journal has been published by State Library Victoria and is published once a year in December.

=== Chess Collection ===
The library houses a wide range of materials dedicated to the history, study and practice of chess. It contains a collection of items from the Anderson Chess Collection, one of the three largest public chess collections in the world. In addition to bookshelves containing an extensive range of books and periodicals relating to chess, the room has game tables with chessboards and pieces, and a few glass cabinets containing historical chess paraphernalia. The Chess Room was closed in February 2017 with collections temporarily moved to the LaTrobe Reading Room. In 2019, the chess collection and game sets were relocated to the renovated Ian Potter Queen's Hall.

== National eDeposit (NED) ==
As a member library of National and State Libraries Australia (NSLA), the organisation collaborated on the creation of the national edeposit (NED) system, which enables publishers from all over Australia to upload electronic publications as per the 2016 amendment to the Copyright Act 1968 and other regional legislation relating to legal deposit, and makes these publications publicly accessible online (depending on access conditions) from anywhere via Trove. As CEO of State Library Victoria and Chair of NSLA, Kate Torney played an important role on the steering committee, which met 100 times during the two-year build phase of the project.

== In popular culture ==
The exterior of the Library is prominently featured at the conclusion of the post-World War III-set movie On the Beach.

Rock band Faker shot the music video for their 2005 single "Hurricane" in the La Trobe Reading Room.

The La Trobe Reading Room was featured in the 2012 film Any Questions for Ben?, in the scene in which Ben discusses the prospect of addressing his alma mater with his mentor, Sam.

The La Trobe Reading Room is the setting for a confrontation between Justin Theroux's character Kevin Garvey and a librarian in the fourth episode of the third season of the critically acclaimed HBO drama series The Leftovers.

Parts of the Library were used for the SBS series Safe Home and the ABC series The Newsreader.

== Gallery ==
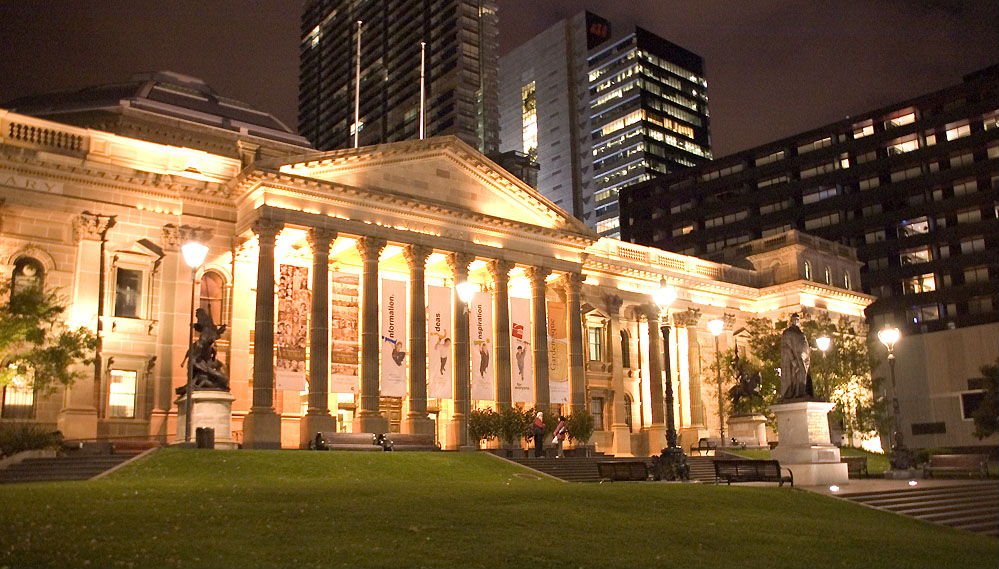
The library at night

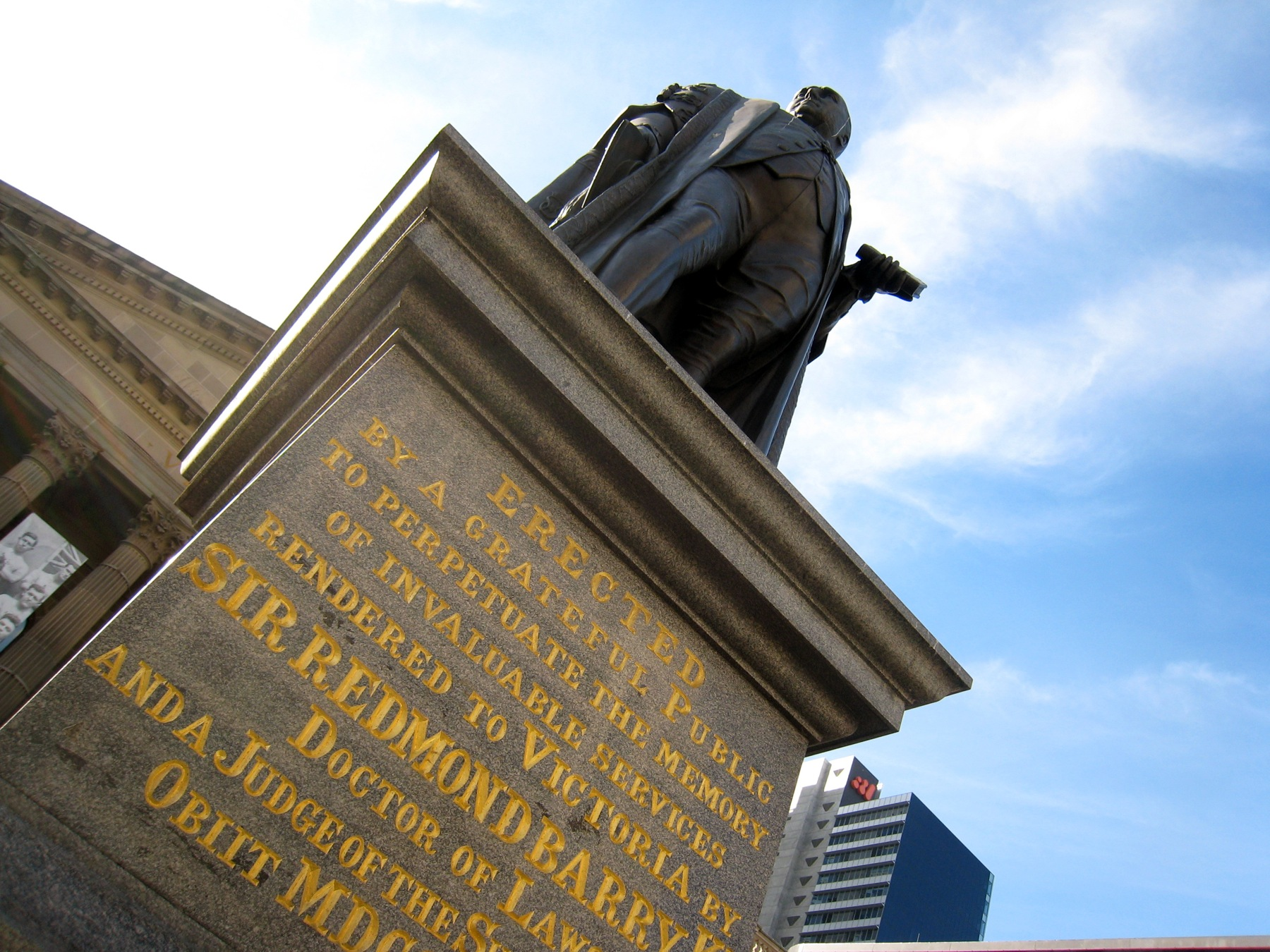
Statue of library founder Redmond Barry

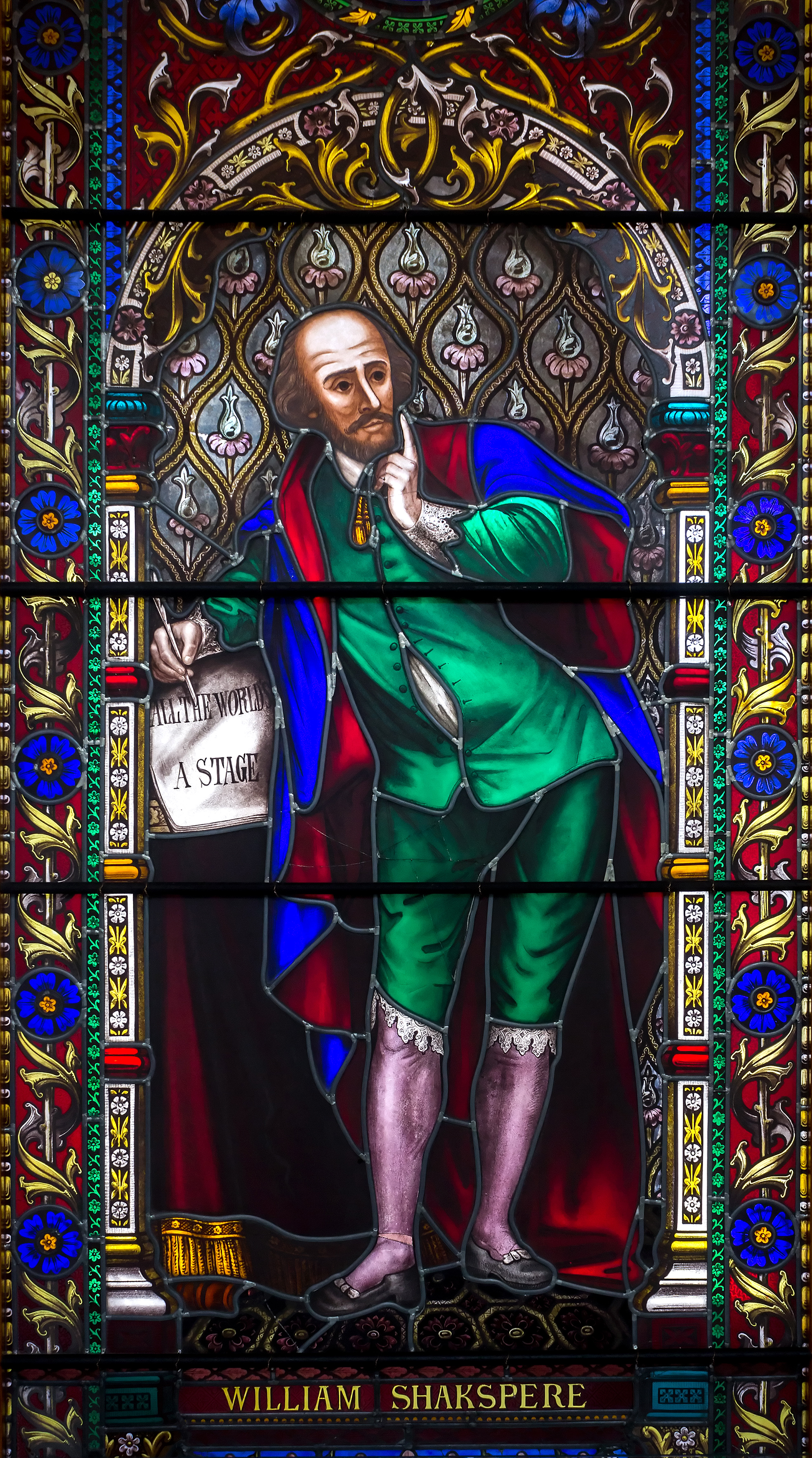
Stained glass window of William Shakespeare, created in 1862

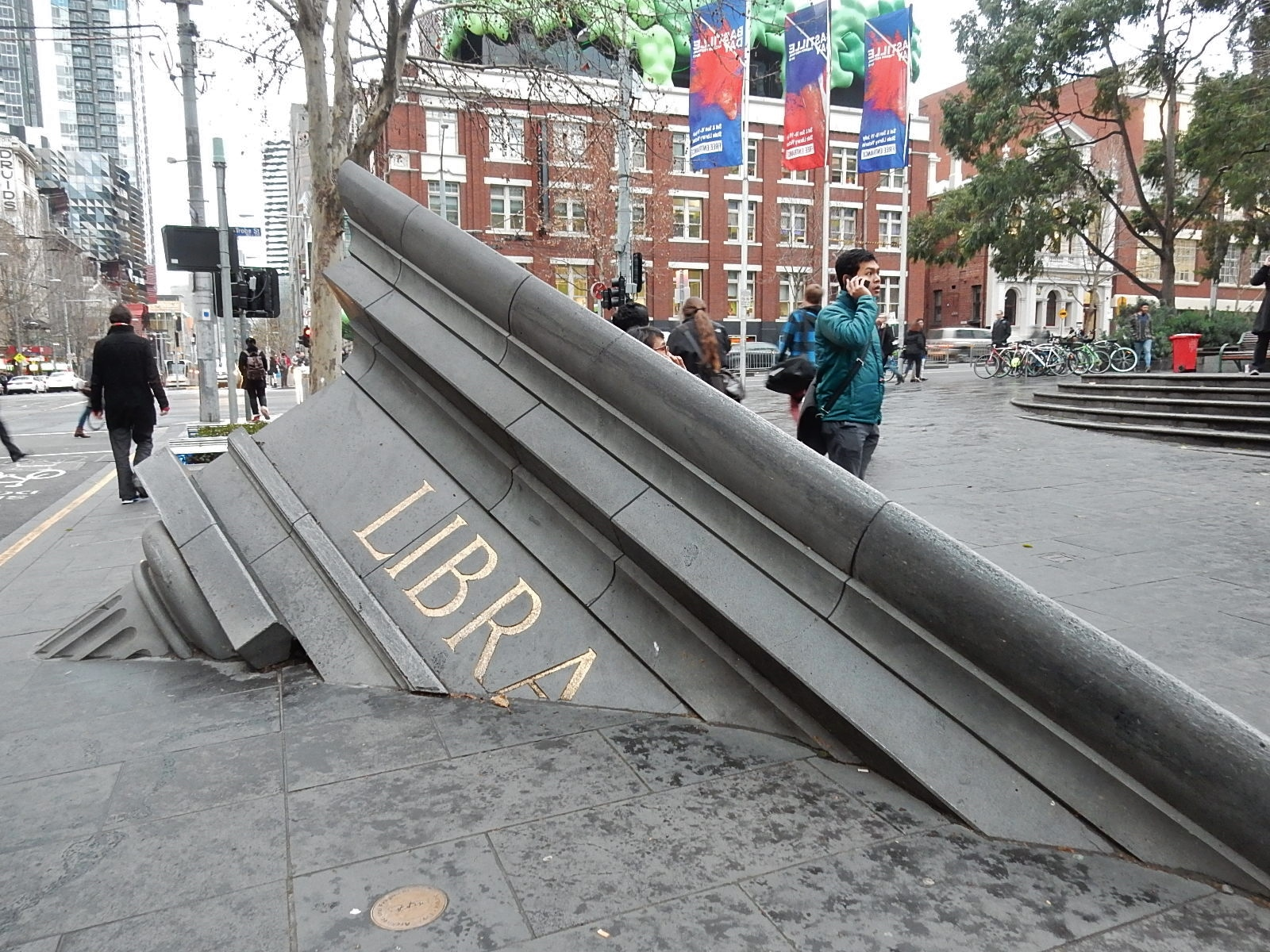
Architectural Fragment, installed outside the library on Swanston Street in 1993

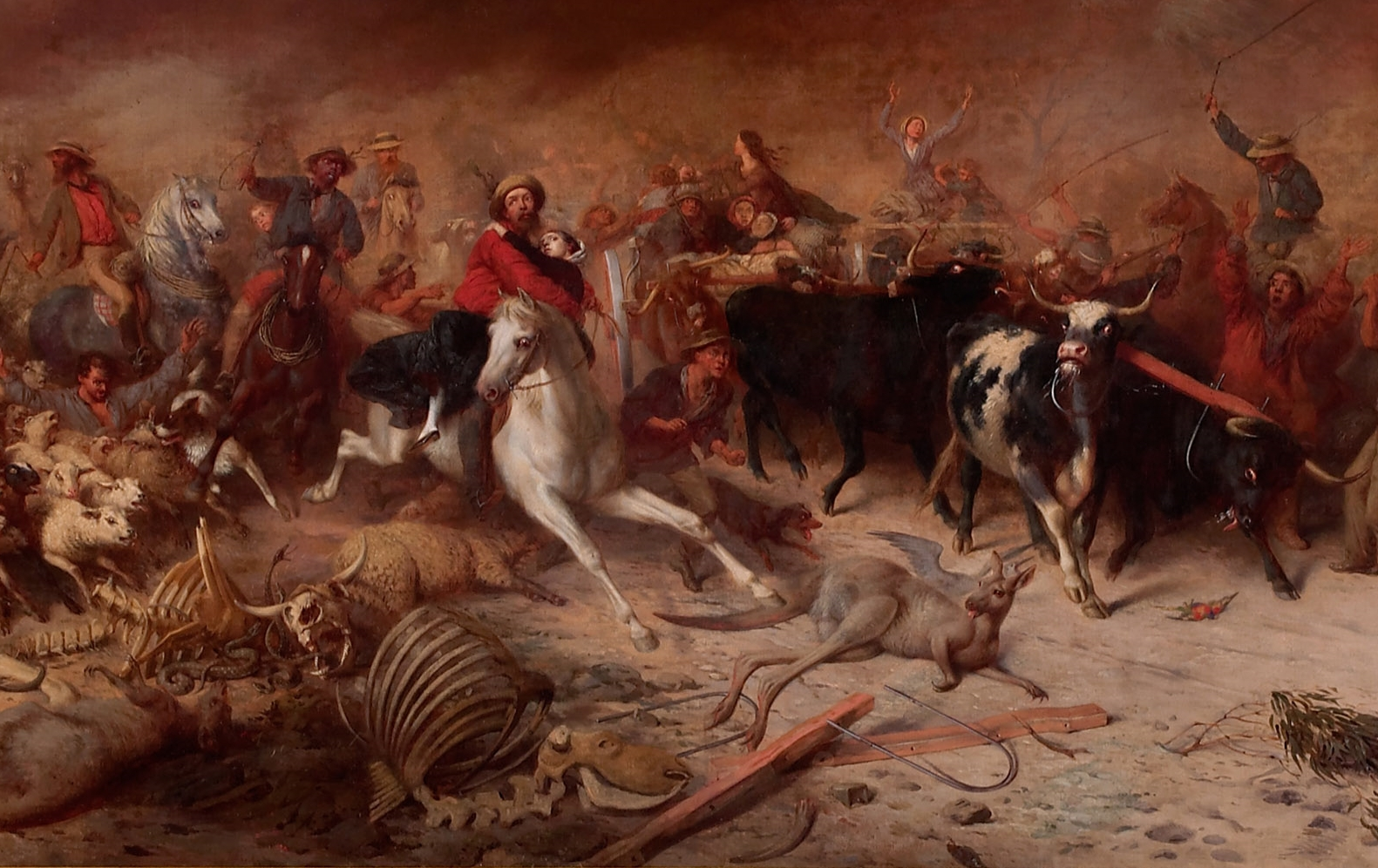
Detail of William Strutt's panoramic painting Black Thursday, 6th February, 1864

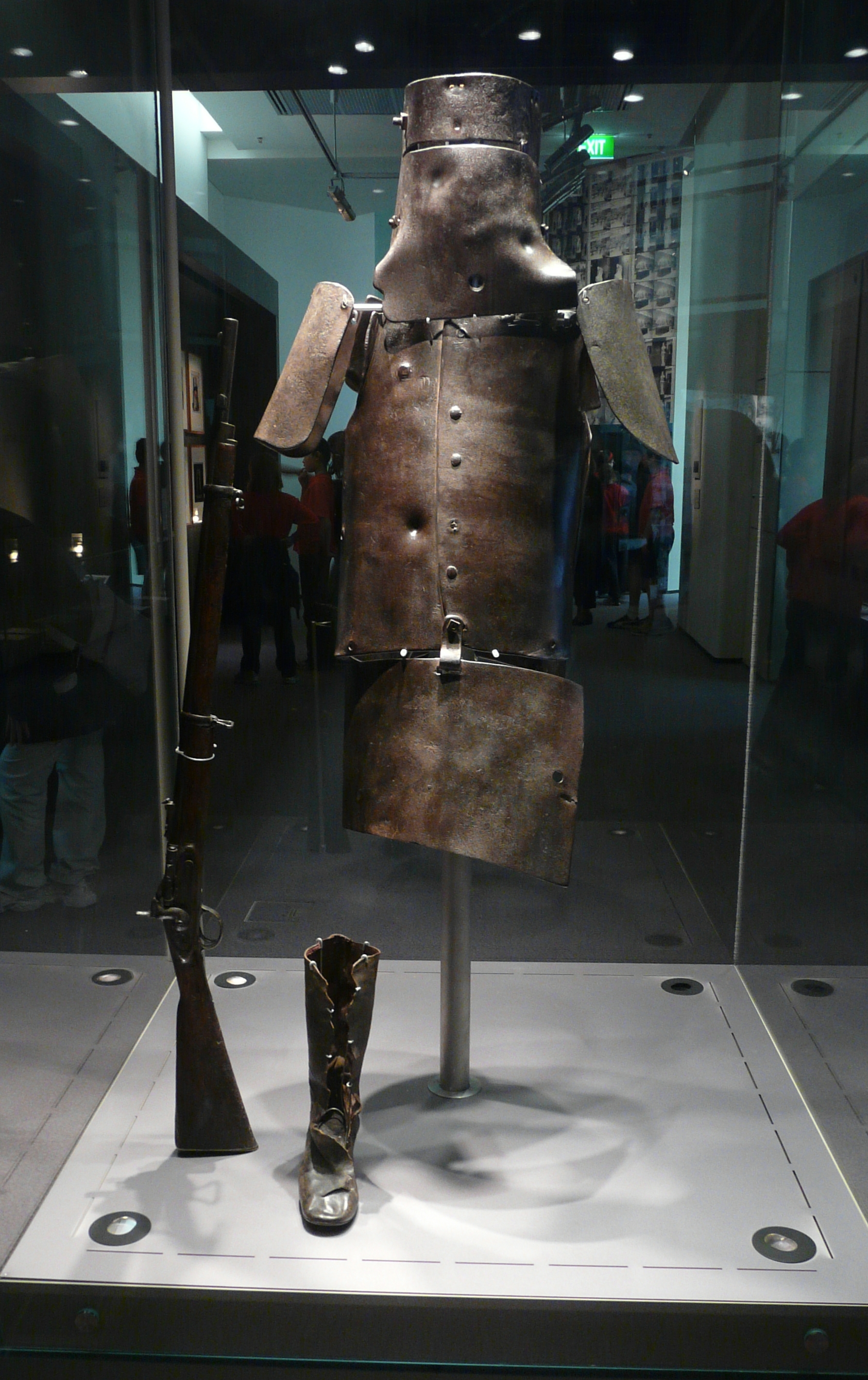
Ned Kelly's armour

== See also ==
- Edmund la Touche Armstrong
- Museums Victoria
- National Gallery of Victoria
- Architecture of Melbourne
- List of heritage-listed buildings in Melbourne
- Victorian architecture
- State Library of New South Wales
- State Library of Western Australia
- State Library of South Australia
- State Library of Queensland
- State Library of Tasmania
