= Library & Archives NT =

Library and archives in Northern Territory

Coordinates: 12°27′37.4″S 130°50′30.8″E

- Location: Darwin City, Millner, Alice Springs, Australia
- Type: State library
- Reference to legal mandate: Publications (Legal Deposit) Act 2004

Collection
- Legal deposit: Since 2004

Other information
- Website: lant.nt.gov.au

Library & Archives NT is the "state" library and archives for the Northern Territory of Australia. It has three venues located in Darwin (on the ancestral lands of the Larrakia people) and Alice Springs (on the land of the Arrernte people). It is the Northern Territory’s leading public research library and archives service, dedicated to preserving Territory history and connecting communications through stories, records, and memories. It’s vast collections include NT Government archives, books, newspapers, photographs, maps, magazines, ephemera, letters, diaries, community and organisational records, and oral histories. In addition, Library & Archives NT supports a network of public libraries across all parts of the Northern Territory.

The institution resulted from a 2020 merger of the Northern Territory Library and the Northern Territory Archives Service. Library & Archives NT is a part of the Northern Territory government’s Department of People, Sport and Culture.

Library & Archives NT provides its services to the public through three key venues: in the Education and Community Precinct (Danala) in Darwin City, at the Northern Territory Archives Centre in Millner and in Minerals House in Alice Springs. It also provides services through a number of online channels.

== Services ==
Library & Archives NT holds the largest collection of books, journals, newspapers and audio-visual materials relating to the Northern Territory. The institution provides support to a network of public libraries across the Northern Territory, including many in remote communities, with the aim to assist them to "develop community literacy and learning, provide access to the Internet and other technology, build digital skills and act as safe and trusted community spaces". It also holds regular events and exhibitions.

As a member library of National and State Libraries Australia, the organisation collaborated on the creation of the National edeposit system, which enables Australian publishers to upload electronic publications as per legal deposit requirements, and makes eligible publications publicly accessible online.

== Digital archive ==
Library & Archives NT has a comprehensive archive of historical and culturally significant materials in the Northern Territory. The collection, titled Territory Stories, includes documents, photographs, and audio and video files to which the public contribute, especially through local knowledge centres managed by the community, including Indigenous communities.

== Events ==
Library & Archives NT host the following annual events:

- Northern Territory Literary Awards; these awards acknowledge and celebrate the outstanding literary talents of established and aspiring NT writers. There are awards across seven categories including: essay, flash fiction, non fiction, poetry, short story, theatre and youth.
- The Northern Territory History Book Award; this award looks for the most significant book about the Northern Territory history published in the last year. The award was established in 2004 and the judging panel consists of academics, historians and/or curators working in the field of Northern Territory history.
- The Annual History Colloquium; this colloquium is designed to showcase research by established and emerging historians and archaeologists whose field of study incorporates the NT. This event is run in partnership with the Professional Historians' Association (NT), Charles Darwin University and the Australian National University.

It also hosts a variety of other events including book launches and talks, floor talks, workshops, exhibition tours, documentary/movie screenings and other talks and seminars.
