= Kate Torney =

Australian journalist and CEO

Kate Torney OAM
- Education: Bachelor of Arts (Media Studies)
- Alma mater: RMIT University
- Occupation: CEO Peter MacCallum Cancer Foundation

Kate Torney is an Australian journalist who is CEO of the Peter MacCallum Cancer Foundation and was the CEO of the State Library of Victoria from 2015 to 2021.

Torney worked as a radio and TV reporter, producer, bureau chief, executive producer and editor.

Torney was ABC News (Australia) Director, overseeing all news and current affairs content for the national broadcaster.

Torney served as member and former Chair of National and State Libraries Australia (NSLA), and serves on the board of The Conversation and is Chair of the Wheeler Centre.

She was formerly a member of the Ministerial Council for Volunteers and the Ministerial Council for the Creative State.
