= Allport Library and Museum of Fine Arts =

- Established: 27 October 1972; 54 years ago
- Location: Hobart, Tasmania
- Type: Museum library
- Key holdings: Gould's Sketchbook of fishes
- Collections: Georgian, Victorian, Australiana and Tasmanian history
- Collection size: 11,000
- Founder: Henry Allport
- Curator: Caitlin Sutton
- Owner: Public

The Allport Library and Museum of Fine Arts is a museum library in Hobart, Tasmania, Australia. Managed by Libraries Tasmania, it is located inside the State Library of Tasmania building. It represents one of the largest collections representing Tasmanian colonial and pre-Colonial life, and also holds a collection of rare British and European porcelain, furniture and books. It was opened in 1972 and entrance is free to the public.

== History ==
The Allport family settled in Tasmania in 1831. A respected family of British lawyers, their family seat of Cedar Court, in Aldridge is today a Grade II listed house. Joseph Allport was born as the youngest son of William Allport, and his wife Hannah Curzon, his second marriage. Hannah ran a school from the house, where John Glover was drawing teacher. In 1831, Joseph Allport emigrated to Tasmania and settled in Broadmarsh, Tasmania.

His last male descendant, Henry Allport, died in 1965 and left the family home of Cedar Court, Sandy Bay, his extensive personal collections and that of his family, and an endowment for the continued growth of the collection, and establishment of a library. In 1972 the collection was moved to an environment controlled storage inside the State Library of Tasmania's 11 story tower. It was officially opened on 27 October 1972, by Lady Alexandra Hasluck, wife of the Governor-General.

== Management ==
The Allport Library is managed by Libraries Tasmania, under a management committee consisting of two trustees of Henry Allport's will, one seat nominated by the Tasmanian Museum and Art Gallery, one seat reserved for an expert in rare art and books appointed by the Minister, and a representative of the Department for Education, Children and Young People. It is governed under the Allport Library and Museum of Fine Arts Agreement Act 1966.

== Collection ==
The Allport Library collection is extensive. It includes numerous notable or unusual items. In total, the collection includes an estimated 2000 photographs, 600 prints, 70 oil paintings and 1,700 watercolours and drawings, 400 pieces of China, 125 pieces of glassware, 350 items of silver, 200 pieces of colonial furniture, and six thousand books and other printed items.

These include a portrait of John Glover, by Mary Allport; a number of the earliest photographs taken in Tasmania; a collection of photographs by John Watt Beattie; sketches by Thomas Bock, and most famously, William Buelow Gould's Sketchbook of fishes, which is recognised as a UNESCO document of world significance.

A significant collection of paintings and sketches by John Glover are also included. These are accompanied by original watercolours by Richard Parkes Bonington, John Sell Cotman, Peter De Wint, David Roberts, J. M. W. Turner, and John Varley.

Henry Allport's wife, Claudine, collected fine British porcelain and her collection is also within the Allport Library. These include a Chelsea 'Goat and Bee' jug, perhaps the earliest example of English porcelain from 1745, and four plates from the Nantgarw China Works.

The collection also includes a number of rare books, with a particular focus on the history of Australia, New Zealand and the Pacific. These include Louis de Freycinet's Voyage autour du monde, and extensive collections of papers, pamphlets and records from historic Tasmanian institutions, such as the Bank of Van Diemen's Land.

In 2014, the Library acquired Margaret Hope's collection of Tasmanian wildflower watercolours

Most of the library collection is kept in blacked out storage on upper levels of the State Library building. A section of the collection is displayed in the form of a recreation of the rooms of the Allport family home, decorated in 16th to 19th century furniture, and with a display of art by family members or other contemporaries. A rotating art gallery of both contemporary and historic art is attached to this display. Past exhibitions have included the life and story of Jørgen Jørgensen and the history of Tasmanian cookery, including recipes on kangaroo brains.

== See also ==
Gallery of former exhibition at the Allport Library
