= Amelia Lucy Wayn =

(1862–1951) Australia historical researcher

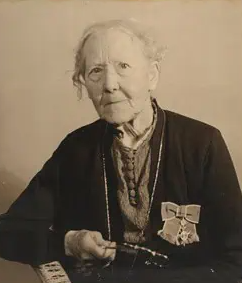
- Born: 1862; Germany
- Died: 11 August, 1951; Hobart
- Occupations: nurse and researcher
- Known for: organising the records of Tasmania

Amelia Lucy Wayn MBE (1862 – 11 August, 1951) was an Australian historical researcher and the primary employee under The Tasmanian Public Records Act 1943 which established the first official archives in Tasmania and was the foundation of the Archives Office of Tasmania. She was awarded Member of the Order of the British Empire (MBE) in 1941.

== Early life ==
Wayn was born in Koblentz in Germany in 1862 to her parents Reverend Arthur Wayn, who was an Anglican clergyman, and Amelia Wayn, nee Ibbotson. She arrived in Tasmania with her parents in 1864. Her mother died in 1877 leaving Amelia to move around with her father as he visited the various parishes. She looked after her father for many years and after he retired she trained at Launceston Public Hospital in 1896 as a nurse. After a time in England, in which she gained a certificate for massage, Wayn moved and settled in Hobart. In 1900 she and Matron Moore-Robinson, nee Augusta Isabel McDowall, opened Fairfield Private Hospital which they ran together until 1915.

== Military career ==
Amelia enlisted in June 1915 for service in the Australian Army Nursing Service. She was posted to hospitals in Tasmania; she was most likely not able to go overseas due her age. In 1918, she was given the role of sister-in-charge at the Roseneath Military Hospital. Eventually, she became the matron of the military hospital in Launceston. She served as matron of this military base until she was decommissioned in 1921.

== Later life ==
When she was almost 60, Wayn was employed, in 1921, as a "Lady Indexer" as part of the state's contribution to The Historical Records of Australia. She was to organise the records that went back to the 1820s and held by the Tasmanian Chief Secretary's Department. She was intended to be temporary, but she became the expert in the state's records. Her labours were mostly voluntary and received just a token payment until 1942 when she was paid a salary. She had been made a Member of the Order of the British Empire (MBE) in 1941 and she continued her work until 1949 when an archivist was employed. The records she created up to 1856 were her speciality and the index was named after her.

== Death and legacy ==
Wayn died in Hobart on August 11 1951. She was cremated at Cornelian Bay. The Tasmanian Archive and Heritage Office was established in 2008, as an amalgamation of the various existing services, to provide a single entry point into Tasmanian social history, government records and cultural artefacts. The Wayn index continued to be updated and it has been on-line since 2011.
