= Libraries Tasmania =

Public library system and heritage resource

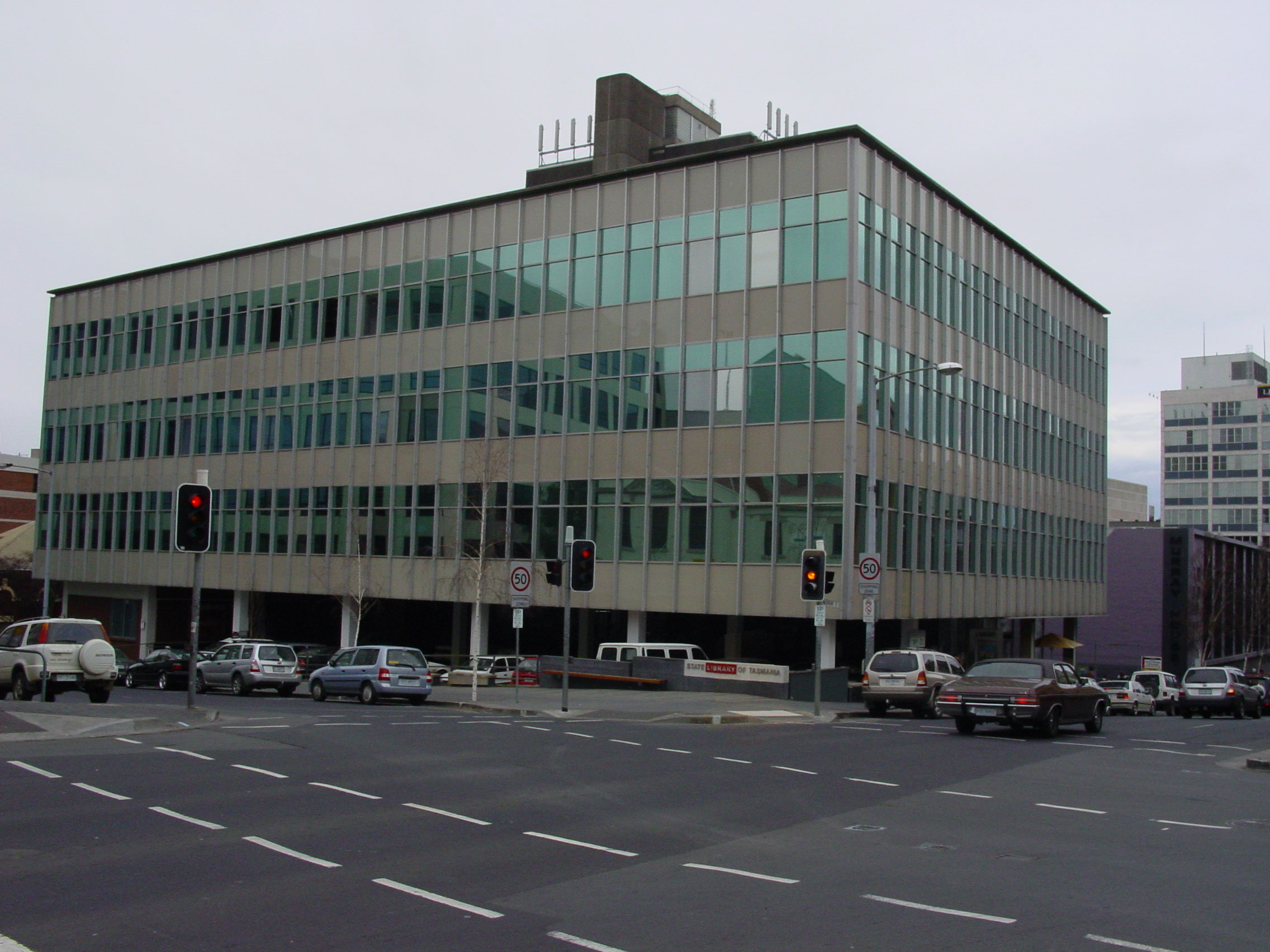
Libraries Tasmania headquarters in Hobart

Libraries Tasmania, formerly LINC Tasmania, is the Tasmanian state government-run organisation that operates libraries in Tasmania, including the state's reference library, a network of public lending libraries, archives, heritage, adult education, and adult literacy services. Earlier predecessors of the network were HuonLINC and the Community Knowledge Network.

== History ==
LINC Tasmania was an initiative of the Tasmanian Department of Education. It brought together the services of the State Library of Tasmania, the Tasmanian Archive and Heritage Office (TAHO), Adult Education Tasmania, and online access centres (public access internet and computer facilities).

In late 2005, HuonLINC opened as a fully integrated service. In October 2006, the State Library, the Archives Office, Adult Education and all online access centres were integrated as the Community Knowledge Network. In 2008, TAHO was established to provide a single entry point into Tasmanian social history, government records and cultural artefacts, and in the following year, seven urban LINC locations were established. In late 2009, the Community Knowledge Network was renamed LINC Tasmania.

In mid-2018, it changed its name to Libraries Tasmania.

== Description ==
Services provided to the Tasmanian community include:

- Public library services and facilities
- Research resources and support
- Adult education courses
- Adult literacy skills support (since 2009)
- Access to historical, archival and contemporary information about Tasmania's Heritage
- Access to Tasmanian Government records and resources

Libraries Tasmania facilities received over 3,500,000 in-person visits in the Australian financial year 2018–19.

== Locations ==
Libraries Tasmania has facilities in 50 locations across the state, including 12 major urban libraries, and 33 smaller branch libraries in regional and rural centres.

== NSLA and NED ==
As a member library of National and State Libraries Australia, the organisation collaborated on the creation of the National edeposit (NED) system, which enables publishers from all over Australia to upload electronic publications as per legal deposit requirements, and makes these publications publicly accessible online (depending on access conditions) from anywhere.
