= National and State Libraries Australasia =

Governing body of the national, state and territory libraries in Australia

National and State Libraries Australasia (NSLA) Inc.
- Established: 1973, as the State Librarians' Council

Other information
- Website: www.nsla.org.au

National and State Libraries Australasia (NSLA) Inc., is an incorporated association and the peak body that represents the national, state and territory libraries of Australia and New Zealand. NSLA coordinates collaborative projects, networks and working groups addressing issues sector issues, including: copyright issues, archival collections, collection development, digital preservation, and oral history, with a focus on strengthening respectful and responsive relationships between First Nations library professionals, and tangata whenua. In partnership with the Australian Library and Information Association, NSLA compiles annual statistics on public library activities and usage throughout Australia, statistics on the services of its own collaborating libraries, and collaborates with partner organisations such as the Australian Research Council on research and development projects.

Precursors to the organisation include the State Librarians Council, the State Libraries Council and Council of Australian State Libraries (CASL).

Two pieces of work in recent years have been the design and implementation of the Australia's National edeposit service (NED), an online service for the deposit, archiving, management, discovery and delivery of published electronic material, and the Culturally-safe Libraries Program, which is overseen by a First Nations Advisory Group.

== History ==
State librarians from New South Wales, Western Australia, South Australia, Tasmania, Queensland and Victoria first met as the State Librarians Council in March 1973, with the aim of forming a peak body to represent and lobby for their organisations in dealings with the Commonwealth Government. The Northern Territory joined in 1980, Australian Capital Territory in 1987 and the National Library of Australia from 1986 onwards. In 1990 it was renamed to the State Libraries Council, with the membership including the CEOs of the Northern Territory and Australian Capital Territory Library and Information Services, and the National Library of Australia.

From 1992, the organisation became the Council of Australian State Libraries (CASL). During this time, many projects were developed, such as the Distributed National Collection agreement and the AskNow online virtual reference service. With the National Library of New Zealand attending first as an observer and then a member, in 2005, it decided on a change of name to reflect this, becoming National and State Libraries Australasia (NSLA). The first NSLA meeting was held at the State Library of Western Australia in September 2006. The association incorporated as NSLA Inc. in 2002.

== Membership and aims ==
NSLA's members include:

- ACT Records Office and Heritage Library
- Libraries Tasmania
- National Library of Australia
- National Library of New Zealand
- Library and Archives NT
- State Library of New South Wales
- State Library of Queensland
- State Library of South Australia
- State Library of Tasmania
- State Library Victoria
- State Library of Western Australia

Each member library is represented on a Board of Directors by their Chief Executive, State Librarian, or Director-General, which oversees a wide range of collaborative initiatives among its member libraries and with other organisations. It aims to improve library services throughout its member libraries by collaboration, and also contributes to public policy affecting the library sector.

== Research and projects ==
=== NED ===
Legal deposit is an important function of national and state libraries. The federal Copyright Act 1968 and legal deposit legislation pertaining to each state mandates that publishers of any kind must deposit copies of their publications in the National Library of Australia as well as in the state or territory library in their jurisdiction. Until the 21st century, this has applied to all types of printed materials (and in some states, to audio-visual formats as well), and on 17 February 2016, the federal legal deposit provisions were extended to cover electronic publications of all types. Most states and territories are as of 2020 reviewing or amending existing legislation to extend to digital publications as well.

The NLSA consortium has developed and delivered the National edeposit (NED) service for electronic publications, with the project led by the NED Steering Group, consisting of representatives from each member library. NED was formally launched in August 2019, and is now running in all NSLA libraries. Work continues on the system, with further enhancements are in the pipeline.

=== Indigenous heritage position statement ===
In May 2021, NSLA published a position statement on Indigenous Cultural and Intellectual Property (ICIP), which recognises Aboriginal and Torres Strait Islander peoples as the traditional owners and custodians of Australia and acknowledges the gaps in Australian legislation in protecting their cultural heritage. NSLA member libraries "acknowledge their collective, individual and moral responsibilities to ensure that management and access to these collection materials is culturally informed and respectful [which] includes recognition and protection of the ongoing, communal nature of Indigenous Cultural and Intellectual Property (ICIP) rights".
