= VALA =

VALA - Libraries, Technology and the Future Inc. (VALA)
- Founded: 1978
- Purpose: Library science, Information technology, Digital library, Metadata, Electronic publishing, Institutional repository
- Location: Melbourne, Victoria, Australia
- Region served: Galleries, Libraries, Archives, Museums
- Members: approx 640 named persons
- President: Sae Ra Germaine, CAVAL.
- Vice President: Michelle McLean, Casey Cardinia Libraries.
- Treasurer: Andrew Iacuone
- Secretary: Monica Williams
- Revenue: Self-funded not for profit organisation
- Volunteers: 10 person Committee
- Website: https://www.vala.org.au

VALA – Libraries, Technology and the Future Inc. (VALA) is an Australian not-for-profit professional organisation that promotes the use and understanding of information and communication technologies across the galleries, libraries, archives and museum sectors.

== History ==
VALA was established as the Victorian Association for Library Automation in 1978 in response to the emergence of automated library catalogues and other technologies that were revolutionising the industry at the time. In 2006 VALA's name was changed to VALA – Libraries, Technology and the Future. This was in recognition of dramatic changes in the information landscape which include the rise of ebooks and ejournals, the social web, cloud computing and mobile devices. Previously, VALA had signed separate memorandum of understanding (MoU) between the Australian Library and Information Association (ALIA) and the New Zealand Library Association LIANZA to foster cooperation and to better coordinate the respective organisation's activities.

== Governance and membership ==
VALA is governed by a Committee elected annually from the VALA membership. Membership is open to anyone interested in the professional aims of the organisation.

== Conferences ==
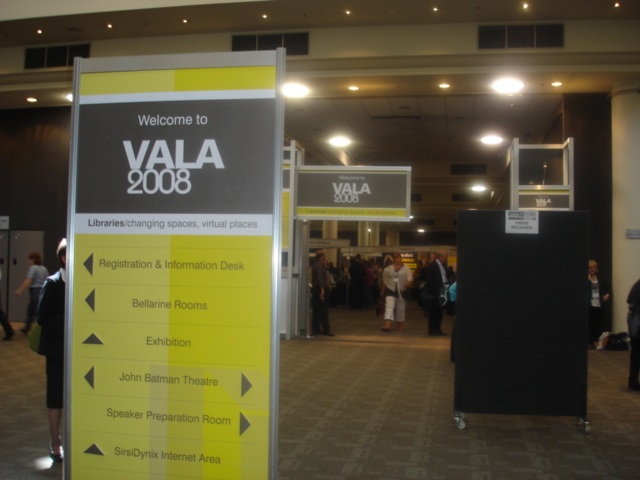
Entrance to the VALA2008 Conference Trade Exhibition

The VALA biennial conference is one of the largest conferences of its type in the region. Commencing in 1981, VALA conferences have provided one of the major points of contact for Australian librarians with their overseas counterparts.

Since 2010 VALA conferences have been held in the Melbourne Convention and Exhibition Centre.

Date	Conference	Theme
09-11 July 2024	22nd VALA Biennial Conference and Exhibition	ReITerated - Getting IT back to grass roots
14-16 June 2022	21st VALA Biennial Conference and Exhibition	Bring IT On! Onsite and Online
11–13 February 2020	20th VALA Biennial Conference and Exhibition	Focus on the Future
13–15 February 2018	19th VALA Biennial Conference and Exhibition	Libraries, Technology and the Future
8–11 February 2016	18th VALA Biennial Conference and Exhibition	Libraries, Technology and the Future
3–6 February 2014	17th VALA Biennial Conference and Exhibition	Streaming with possibilities
6–9 February 2012	16th VALA Biennial Conference and Exhibition	eM-Powering eFutures
8–11 February 2010	15th VALA Biennial Conference and Exhibition	Connections, Content, Conversations
5–11 February 2008	14th VALA Biennial Conference and Exhibition	Libraries/Changing Spaces, Virtual Places
8–10 February 2006	13th VALA Biennial Conference and Exhibition	Connecting with Users
3–5 February 2004	12th VALA Biennial Conference and Exhibition	Breaking Boundaries: Integration & Interoperability
6–8 February 2002	11th VALA Biennial Conference and Exhibition	e-volving information futures
6–18 February 2000	10th VALA Biennial Conference and Exhibition	Books and bytes : technologies for the hybrid library

== Professional development events ==
VALA holds a series of face-to-face and online professional development events throughout the year. The topics of the meetings support and promote an understanding of technology within the libraries and broader information sector. Where possible, free podcasts of these meetings are available on the VALA web site.

== Awards ==
VALA aims to further support research in and around the library information science sector through the provision of a series of awards

VALA grants the following awards:

- The Robert D. Williamson Award – Awarded biennially to an individual or organisation who, in the opinion of the judging panel, is currently making an outstanding contribution to the development of information technology usage in Australian libraries and is positively and significantly influencing development in information technology usage within libraries.
- The VALA Award – made biennially, is presented to the Australian library or information centre judged to have made the most innovative use of information technology during the previous two years.
- The VALA Travel Scholarship – every two years VALA offers up to two Travel Scholarships to enable suitable persons to travel overseas to examine aspects of library automation. Recipients receive up to A$13,000 towards travel, accommodation and living expenses. Successful candidates must complete their study in time to present their findings at the following VALA Biennial Conference.
- The VALA Student Award - Each year, the VALA Student Award is presented to one student from RMIT University and one from Monash University, in recognition of outstanding achievement in postgraduate library and information management courses.

Year	VALA Award Winners
2025	Monash Health and State Library of Queensland
2022	State Library of Queensland
2020	State Library of New South Wales and State Library of Queensland
2018	State Library of Queensland
2016	National Library of Australia and University of Melbourne
2014	Curtin University Library
2012	Griffith University Research Hub
2010	Willoughby City Library, New South Wales
2008	Informit TVNews
2006	State Library of Queensland
