= State Library of Tasmania =

Library in Hobart, Tasmania, Australia

Coordinates: 42.881735°S 147.324552°E

Hobart Library
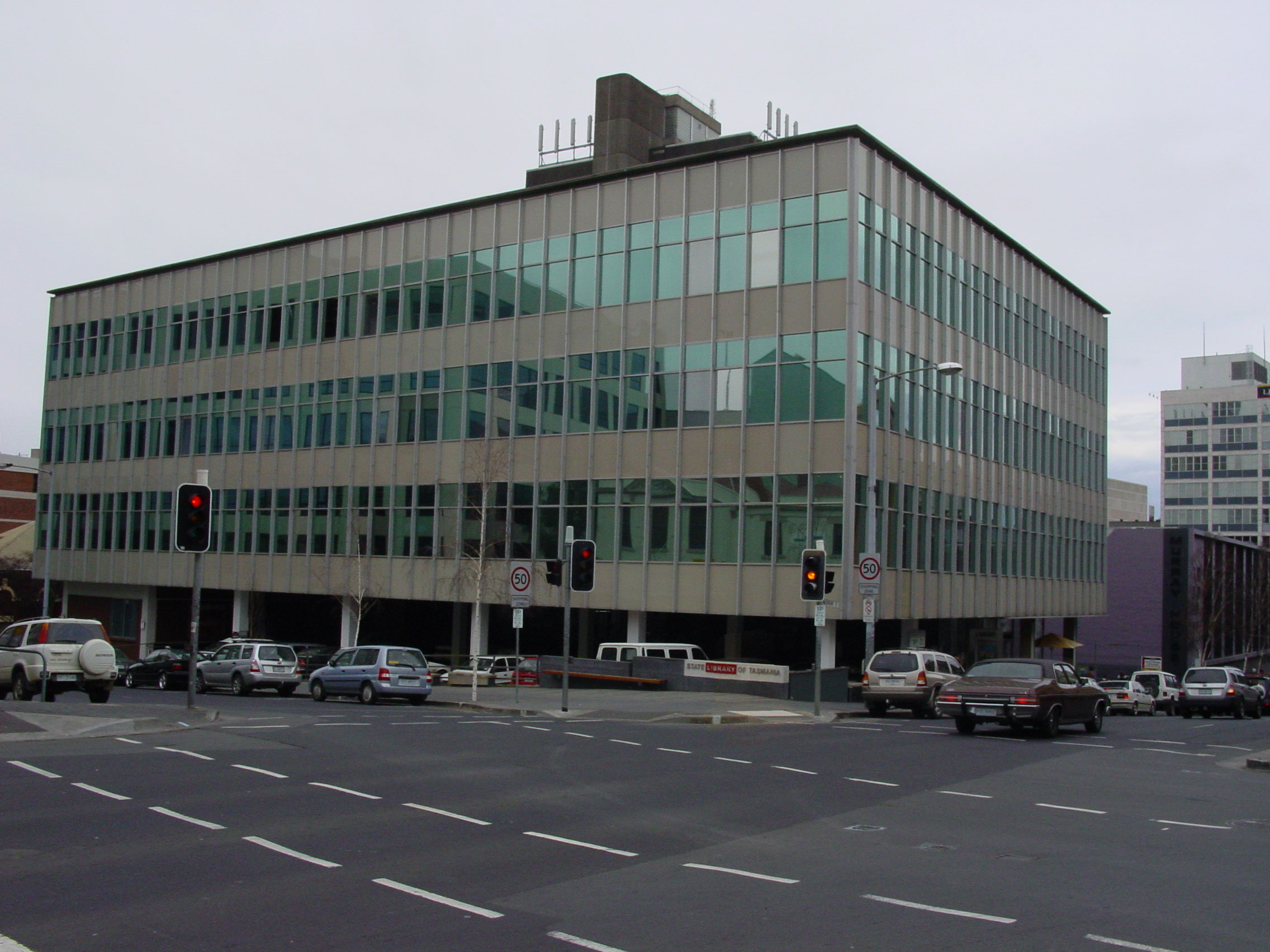
- Libraries Tasmania HQ, including the State Library, in Hobart
- Location: Hobart, Tasmania, Australia
- Branch of: Libraries Tasmania

Collection
- Legal deposit: Yes

The State Library of Tasmania is the reference, special collections, research and public lending library in the Tasmanian capital of Hobart, Australia. It is part of Libraries Tasmania. Libraries Tasmania includes a state-wide network of library services, community learning, adult literacy and the State’s archives and heritage services.

== History ==
The first "Tasmanian Public Library" opened in 1849, in a house in Hobart, funded by a government grant and yearly subscription of members. It became accessible to the public in 1860, but was forced to close in 1867 owing to debts. In 1870 a new, free public reference library opened in the Hobart Town Hall. American philanthropist Andrew Carnegie funded the move to new premises in 1907, with the requirement that a free lending service should be established at the same time.

The Libraries Act (1943) established the State Library of Tasmania, administered by the Tasmanian Library Board. At this time, the Library included many branches across the state, which grew in number over time until such time as some were closed in government rationalisations.

From October 2006, the State Library, the Archives Office, Adult Education and online access centres were integrated as the Community Knowledge Network, renamed LINC Tasmania in 2009. The system was part of the Tasmanian Department of Education. The name changed from LINC Tasmania to Libraries Tasmania in mid-2018.

== Location and description ==
The headquarters of Libraries Tasmania, which also houses the State Library, is located at the corner of Murray and Bathurst Street in Hobart. The public Reading Room is located on the second floor of the building.

The State Library contains over 200,000 books, periodicals, maps and directories. Reference and research services are provided to on-site and off-site clients using a range of print and online resources.

== Heritage Collections ==
The library operates several collections and archives of historical publications and documents, particularly those related to Tasmania. In addition, the library maintains a newspaper index, an image library and a database of sheet music.

=== Tasmaniana Library ===
A collection of historical and modern published material related to Tasmania, in a range of formats from paper to digital. All Tasmanian-related material is collected including all works published in Tasmania, all works published about Tasmania, and all works by Tasmanian authors.

=== W. L. Crowther Library ===
The W. L. Crowther Library is a collection of historical books, documents, photographs, works of art and objects collected by Sir William Crowther, whose great-grandfather arrived in Hobart in 1825. The library contains about 15,000 books and manuscripts, as well as photographs and artworks, and whaling ephemera including a collection of scrimshaw. The collection was donated by William Edward Lodewyk Hamilton Crowther (1887-1981), son of Edward Lodewyk Crowther and grandson of W. L. Crowther, in 1964, and also includes extensive content about his own military service, including his own diaries.

=== Allport Library and Museum of Fine Arts ===
Another collection of historical material, bequeathed to the people of Tasmania by the Allport family to the library in 1965. It includes about 6,000 books, and outstanding collection of about 2,500 colonial-era artworks (by family members and others) and collections of Georgian era furniture, British, French and Chinese porcelain.

== Digital collections ==
In 1998, the State Library developed a service to capture and store selected Tasmanian websites, known as Our Digital Island. The sites were downloaded and then reinstalled onto a State Library server, where they would operate independently of the original site, and held in perpetuity. The legal deposit obligations within the Tasmanian Libraries Act 1984 allowed the Library to capture the websites without having to gain permission their Tasmanian publishers. While the service did not capture all Tasmanian websites, it had captured about 600 by 2003. The publicly available store of Our Digital Island contains websites as preserved from 2001 until 2012. The 3000 website records (with over 9000 captures taken at different times) are available through the Libraries Tasmania online catalogue.

Over time, Our Digital Island began to also store electronic documents as separate entities (annual reports, policy documents, etc.), but it became clear that the format did not allow for easy accessibility and use, so the Library set out to create a different type of online depository and archive. The Stable Tasmanian Open Repository Service (STORS) was a joint initiative of the State Library and Service Tasmania that was officially launched in late 2003. Its scope was limited to self-contained electronic resources with a defined title (i.e. excluding websites) which were able to be used by current web browser software. collected all material published in Tasmania, as per legal deposit requirement. The purpose of STORS was to act as a repository for and to provide access to contemporary electronic documents, and to serve the function of an archive by retaining these documents forever. Publishers submitted their digital publications directly to STORS, which by the end of 2017 held about 33,000 items.

STORS was terminated on 31 May 2019, when it was replaced by the National edeposit system (NED), a collaboration between Australia’s nine national, state and territory libraries. As a member library of National and State Libraries Australia, the organisation collaborated on the creation of NED, which enables publishers from all over Australia to upload electronic publications as per the 2016 amendment to the Copyright Act 1968 and other regional legislation relating to legal deposit, and makes these publications publicly accessible online (depending on access conditions) from anywhere via Trove.

The State Library of Tasmania is not a partner organisation in PANDORA, the national web archive.

== See also ==
- State Library of New South Wales
- state Library of Victoria
- State Library of Western Australia
- State Library of South Australia
- State Library of Queensland
