= Tasmanian Archive and Heritage Office =

Part of Libraries Tasmania

- Interactive map of Tasmanian Archive and Heritage Office
- 42.8817°S 147.3252°E
- Location: Hobart, Australia
- Established: 2008
- Website: https://libraries.tas.gov.au/archive-heritage/Pages/default.aspx

The Tasmanian Archive and Heritage Office (TAHO), formerly known as the Archives Office of Tasmania, is a part of Libraries Tasmania, located in Hobart.

== History ==
In 1921 Amelia Lucy Wayn was employed as a "Lady Indexer" as part of the states contribution to The Historical Records of Australia. She was to sort the records that went back to the 1820s and held by the Tasmanian Chief Secretary's Department. She was intended to be temporary but she became the expert on the state's records. Her labours were mostly voluntary and received just a token payment until 1942 when she was paid a salary. She had been made a MBE in 1941 and she continued her work until 1949 when an archivist was employed. The handwritten index she created for records up to 1856 were her speciality and the index is named after her.

The Archives Office of Tasmania had been a separate entity from the Tasmanian state library, despite being housed in the same building. The W E Crowther collection was a special component of the State Library prior to the amalgamation, and was frequently referred to as being the major part of the Heritage Collections of the State Library. TAHO was established in 2008, as an amalgamation of the various existing services, to provide a single entry point into Tasmanian social history, government records and cultural artefacts.

Among its holdings are the Tasmania Police records from the Port Arthur massacre and information on the state's lighthouses and military history.
