= Institute Building =

Historic building in South Australia

- Front view of the Institute Building, 2026

General information
- Type: Cultural building
- Architectural style: Italianate and Victorian Renaissance
- Location: North Terrace, Adelaide, South Australia, Australia
- Coordinates: 34.921074°S 138.602173°E
- Current tenants: Centre of Democracy; Friends of the State Library of South Australia; Royal South Australian Society of Arts; Writers SA
- Construction started: 1859
- Completed: July 1860
- Inaugurated: 29 January 1861
- Renovated: 2003
- Cost: A£4,839
- Owner: Department of the Premier and Cabinet

Technical details
- Material: Rubble masonry

Design and construction
- Architect: Edward Hamilton
- Other designers: C. E. Owen Smyth
- Main contractor: English & Brown

Renovating team
- Renovating firm: Hassell

South Australian Heritage Register
- Official name: Former Institute Building
- Designated: 24 July 1980
- Reference no.: 10846

Institute Building is a cultural building on North Terrace in the Adelaide city centre, South Australia. This building was constructed for the South Australian Institute and had facilities like library, museum, art gallery, School of Art and Design and also served as a place for meetings of learned societies. It was designed by Edward Hamilton in the Italianate and Victorian Renaissance architectural styles and was completed in July 1860 and opened officially on 29 January 1861. It was included in the South Australian Heritage Register on 24 July 1980.

The idea of building this structure came up in 1858, just two years after the creation of South Australian Institute. One particular site proposed near the railway station was objected to because of noise problems due to the railways and other issues relating to its location and further constructions in the Park Lands. William Milne proposed the North Terrace site, east of Government House in 1859 and this site was chosen. William Lines did the foundation work while English and Brown did the construction and cost of construction was A£4,839.

The building was used as a center of adult education and cultural affairs through lectures, exhibitions, concerts, and discussions. As more and more collections and institutions were housed in this building, these moved to different buildings, which included Jervois Wing and Exhibition Building. A northern extension under the supervision of C. E. Owen Smyth was built in 1907, which offered additional space for the circulating library and learned societies. This building is home to the History Trust of South Australia and the Bradman Collection as well. This building underwent renovations during the 2003 development of the State Library of South Australia.

== Background ==
The Institute Building traces its roots to the South Australian Literary and Scientific Association, formed in London after the enactment of the laws creating the Province of South Australia in 1834. This organisation collected a collection of 117 books that sailed into Adelaide on the ship Tam O'Shanter in 1836. This collection was initially housed near the port until it was taken as the collection of the library of the Adelaide Mechanics' Institute, created in 1838. The Institute was first housed in a wooden schoolroom in the Park Lands across from the Holy Trinity Church and engaged in educating the community through public lectures.

There were some financial problems in the 1840s that led to the books of the institute being held against a A£20 debt until they were redeemed in 1845 by contributions from its backers. In 1848, the Mechanics' Institute merged with the South Australian Subscription Library. These organisations were initially located in the Peacock's Building in Hindley Street, until they moved to Exchange Chambers where King William Street met Gresham Place. Reduced subscriptions then led to government help.

A result of an inquiry undertaken by the parliament in 1854, a law was passed that set up the South Australian Institute on 27 May 1856. Its duties included the maintenance of the public library and museum, holding of lectures and classes, and literary, scientific and art promotion. The reading room was available free of charge but borrowing required subscription.

== History ==
=== Construction and opening (1858–1861) ===
In 1858, Edward Hamilton, the colonial architect, was ordered to design the buildings needed by the expanding institute. A plot near the railway station along King William Road met with criticism due to noise pollution from the railways, location and more construction in the parklands. In the debate in parliament in 1859, William Milne supported a site east of Government House along North Terrace, which was later selected. The foundation was made by William Lines and the building was erected by English and Brown, costing £4,839 and completed in July 1860. The governors of the institute started using it in August.

Chief Justice Charles Cooper officially inaugurated the building on 29 January 1861 in the absence of Governor Richard Graves MacDonnell. There were approximately 850 people at the opening ceremony that included music performances, recitation, scientific experiments, and exhibitions of art pieces and manufactured goods. The building housed the library, reading room, museum, art gallery, School of Art and Design and meeting rooms for associated societies such as the Philosophical Society and South Australian Society of Arts. The building became a place for adult education where lectures, concerts, recitations and soirées were held.

=== Development and expansion (1863–1907) ===
Institute Building viewed from across the street before the northern extension, 1865

The annual exhibition of the Society of Arts was held in this building in 1863. However, it stopped holding annual exhibitions there in 1869 since its rooms were found to be insufficient. Gas light installation was completed on 8 December 1863. In 1867, there were 40 associated societies within the institute, and the library contained approximately 13,000 volumes and had 900 subscribers. The number of visitors in 1871 reached around 1,000 people weekly. Between 1873 and 1874, gas chandeliers of the reading room were changed to "sunburners".

University lectures were held in the building beginning in 1874 when the University Association commenced. In 1874 an inquiry concluded that the institute and museum required more space, and the library's scientific books collection was insufficient. This resulted in the establishment of separate premises for the collections. Sunday hours began in 1879 for the reading room and the museum. On 1 July 1884, the South Australian Institute became the Public Library, Museum and Art Gallery of South Australia. The Jervois Wing was completed in 1884, and the museum's North Wing in 1895, and the East Wing in 1915.

The School of Design transferred to the Exhibition Building from 1890 to 1891 and the library received incandescent lighting in 1894. The acquisition of the York Gate Library from England by the Royal Geographical Society in 1905 led to the need for additional accommodation. Large additions to the north of the main building were carried out from 1906 to 1907 under C. E. Owen Smyth, Superintendent of Public Buildings, and officially opened by the Governor George Le Hunte on 12 June 1907. It included accommodation for the circulating library, Royal Society of South Australia, South Australian branch of the Royal Geographical Society of Australasia, and Society of Arts, along with a reading room and two-storey caretaker's dwelling facing Kintore Avenue.

=== Later use and heritage listing (1912–1999) ===
Institute Building viewed from the southwest at the intersection of North Terrace and Kintore Avenue, c. 1915

Between 1912 and 1980, it was occupied by the Association of South Australia of the Institutes. Between 1919 and 1920, the original entrance staircase was dismantled and the first floor opening made into a room to give more space to the association and the Adelaide Circulating Library. Electric lighting was added in 1921. After the removal of the Royal Geographical Society to the Jervois Wing in 1965, their rooms were made into a lecture theatre. The Adelaide Circulating Library stopped operations in 1975 although their books still remained in the building.

Some of the later occupants include the Women's Information Switchboard, which stayed here between 1978 and 1997, and the Women's Studies Resource Centre which stayed here between 1979 and 1984. It was added to the South Australian Heritage Register on 24 July 1980, and was the home of the History Trust of South Australia from 1981 to 1997. The western room was used as a newspaper reading room up till April 1990.

The refurbishment for the Bradman Collection exhibit included the restoration of the entrance stairs in 1998. This exhibition opened on 29 January of the same year, launched by then Prime Minister John Howard.

=== Recent changes (2000–present) ===
The building received renovation and restoration in the course of 2003 redevelopment of the State Library. It also included restoration of the Jervois Wing, transformation of the former Bastyan Building into the Spence Wing, and creation of the new glass entrance. Services of architectural design, documentation and interior design were delivered in cooperation with Hassell. Passages connected Spence Wing with Mortlock Wing and Institute Building. Passage from the back of the Institute Building to the foyer of the Spence Wing served as an additional entrance for the library. Spence Wing opened to the general public on 14 July 2003 and officially on 15 October, where the ceremony was attended by Premier Mike Rann, Rupert Murdoch, Pantjiti Unkari McKenzie and indigenous women from Ernabella Arts.

Occupants of the building in 2007 were the Friends of the State Library of South Australia, together with the State Library and Society of Arts. Until 2008, Bradman Collection was kept in the building before it was moved to Adelaide Oval. Ownership of the building belonged to the Department of the Premier and Cabinet in 2014.

The Centre of Democracy was opened in the building on 23 May 2017, launched by Arts Minister Jack Snelling.

In late 2026, work started on creating the new Experience Adelaide Visitor Centre, with A$4 million allocated for refurbishment and creation of the new high-tech hub. It is expected to open early in 2027, with the current visitor centre located behind Adelaide Town Hall on Pirie Street moving into the new space.

== Description and features ==
=== Architecture ===
Principal façade of the Institute Building, showing the main entrance, 2026

View from above of the Institute Building and the King Edward VII Memorial, 2010

The building has been classified as Italianate and Victorian Renaissance, including classical architecture forms. The structure of the walls consists of rendered random rubble. According to an article published in The South Australian Observer on 28 July 1860, the design included Venetian and Grecian architecture styles and was appreciated for its proportions and classical architectural elements.

The façade includes a Doric portico, window arches on Doric pilasters, upper windows between Ionic pilasters with fluting, and cornice. The initial entrance consisted of sliding cedar doors opening onto a cedar screen with plate glass. In the entrance hall, there was a staircase with a polished turned cedar balustrade with cast iron strengthening. There were two staircases that converged at the mezzanine landing from which one more staircase went to the first floor.

The ground floor originally held the circulating library, reading room, coffee room, secretary’s room and boardroom. The reading room included a lecture platform, cedar skirting and window panelling, and two fireplaces featuring mantelpieces constructed from Ransome's patented siliceous stone. A central passage gave access to the rear where there were quarters for the housekeeper. At the time when the Observer visited the building in July 1860, the reading room has not been completed, even though the library walls were still un-plastered and the book shelves not yet put in place. The gas pipes had been inserted into the walls for lighting.

The first floor housed rooms for classes, committee meetings, and the Philosophical Society. There was also a room at the back, around 70 feet (21 m) in length, which could be used as either a gallery, museum or school of design. This room was lit up with skylights with blinds controlled by ropes and pulleys, enabling control over natural light. Wall shafts allowed for ventilation, and there was also temporary accommodation for the doorkeeper located at the back of the building.

The northern extension, which was built in 1907 and managed by Smyth, maintained the same architectural style as Hamilton's first building in the south and had provisions for natural light. The original stairway to the entrance was moved to the northern extension, with its main entrance on Kintore Avenue. In 1998 during renovation, a new stairway was built in the original entrance area. The difference with the earlier design was that it had a single flight of stairs from the ground floor in order to build a security desk.

=== Plaque and memorial ===
The unveiling of the commemorative plaque took place on 2 September 1986, when Governor Donald Dunstan unveiled it. The plaque documents the building construction for library purposes in 1860, as well as the contribution of the institute members from 1836, and institute libraries and the Institutes Association of South Australia from 1898.

King Edward VII Memorial is located along the North Terrace promenade opposite to the Institute Building. It was built in January 1920 and then unveiled by the Prince of Wales on 15 July. Made by an Australian sculptor Bertram Mackennal, the monument consists of a life-size statue of Edward VII dressed in his coronation robes, along with three female statues embodying Peace, Justice and South Australia. The last one has wide-opened arms, while its state products lie at her feet.

The statue is roughly 4.5 metres (15 ft) high above ground level. The pedestal is inscribed "Edward VII King and Emperor 1901–1910", and the entire structure rises to more than 9.1 metres tall. It is sited prominently in front of the building, breaking up the sightline and walkway.

=== Tenants ===
As of November 2026, the Centre of Democracy, Writers SA, Royal South Australian Society of Arts, and Friends of the State Library of South Australia are housed in the building.

== Gallery ==
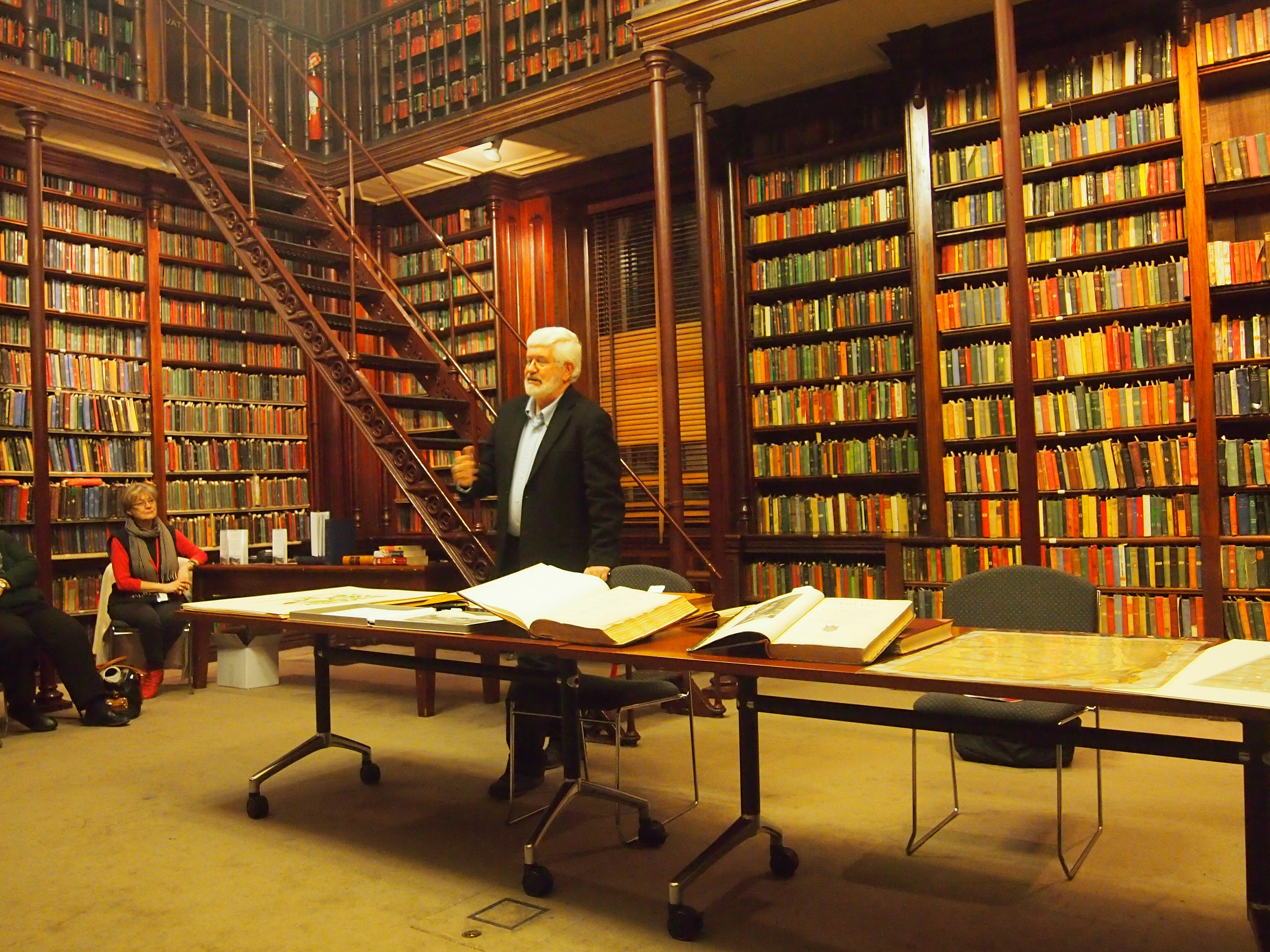
Keith Conlon speaking in the Circulating Library to mark the bicentenary of Flinders's death

King Edward VII Memorial viewed from the Adelaide Metro's Art Gallery tram stop, 2026

Reopening plaque by Premier Lynn Arnold on 2 July 1993, following refurbishment

Centre of Democracy exhibits inside the Institute Building in 2026

Hetzel Lecture Theatre on the ground floor of the building, 2026

Royal South Australian Society of Arts gallery on the first floor of the building, 2026
