= William Tatton Brown =

English architect

William Eden Tatton Brown (13 October 1910 - 2 February 1997) was an English architect. From 1959, he was the first chief architect to the UK's Ministry of Health, taking charge of large-scale hospital building until the mid-1970s.

== Early career ==
William Tatton Brown was born on 13 October 1910 at Lewes in Sussex, the son of Eden Tatton Brown, head of the Egyptian Customs Services and Pauline Stewart-Jones. The family lived in Egypt for some years before returning to England. William Tatton Brown then went to a school in Rottingdean before attending Wellington College.

Tatton Brown studied at the Architectural Association in 1928, then studied history at King's College, Cambridge, spending his final year studying architecture under Hugh Casson. Through Cambridge contacts in the Quaker movement, he secured employment in France with architect André Lurçat, an ardent communist.

Tatton Brown returned to London in 1934 to work in the Haymarket office of the radical architectural practice Tecton, founded by Berthold Lubetkin, where he worked on the Penguin Pool at London Zoo and was job architect for the influential Highpoint flats in Highgate.

An active member of late 1930s Modernist circles, he was a British delegate to the International Congress of Modern Architecture (CIAM). In 1936, Tatton Brown, his wife Aileen, and Hubert de Cronin Hastings (Architectural Press proprietor) formed a three-strong 'Town Planning Committee' within CIAM exploring ideas related to 'linear cities'; Tatton Brown subsequently presented a paper based on the work, The Theory of Contacts and its Application to the Future of London, at the CIAM V Congress in Paris in September 1937. However, this work was subsequently regarded as a "a preliminary survey of London by a section of the MARS Group", and a new and larger Town Planning Committee was convened under Arthur Korn's leadership in December 1937 to produce a revised plan for London under the auspices of the MARS Group which exhibited the initial city ideas at its New Burlington Galleries exhibition in 1938. In the same year, Tatton Brown set up in independent practice, then formed a partnership with Lionel Brett, later Lord Esher.

== Post-war career ==
During World War II, Tatton Brown joined the Royal Engineers and served in India and Burma. After the war, he returned to the Architectural Association, to study town planning, and then joined the new Ministry of Town and Country Planning, working with, among others, Casson, Percy Johnson-Marshall and Peter Shepheard. In 1948, Tatton Brown was appointed Deputy County Architect for Hertfordshire, leading the county's school building programme. Despite severe post-war materials shortages, he led a team of talented architects including David and Mary Medd to deliver prefabricated buildings combining lightweight structures, panels and tubular steel trusses.

In 1959, Tatton Brown became the first Chief Architect to the Ministry of Health, overseeing a department of over 120 architects managing a large-scale hospital building programme through to the mid-1970s. He was awarded CB in the 1965 New Year Honours, and was a member of the Construction Research Advisory Council established in 1967.

Despite officially retiring in 1971, he continued to work for several years, and in 1985, a book he co-wrote with Paul James, Hospitals: Design and Development, was published.

== Works ==
- Chilston Grange, Winkfield, near Ascot, Berkshire (1940; with Lionel Brett)
- Stratton's Tower refurbishment, Little Berkhamsted (1971)
- Greenwich District Hospital (1972)

== Personal life ==
In 1936 Tatton Brown married Aileen Sparrow, a former pupil of Leslie Martin and one of three women working at Tecton. They lived initially in fellow architect Jane Drew's house in Woburn Square. They later lived in Little Berkhamsted, and had four children.
