= State Library of South Australia =

Reference library in Adelaide, South Australia

- The Spence Wing entrance of the State Library of South Australia
- 34.920601215637284°S 138.60283092296615°E
- Location: North Terrace, Adelaide, South Australia, Australia
- Type: State library
- Architects: E. A. Hamilton (Institute Building, 1861); C. E. Owen Smyth (Institute extension, 1907); E. J. Woods (Mortlock, 1884); Hassell and Mitchell/Giurgola (Spence Wing, 2003)

Other information
- Director: Megan Berghuis
- Website: www.slsa.sa.gov.au/home

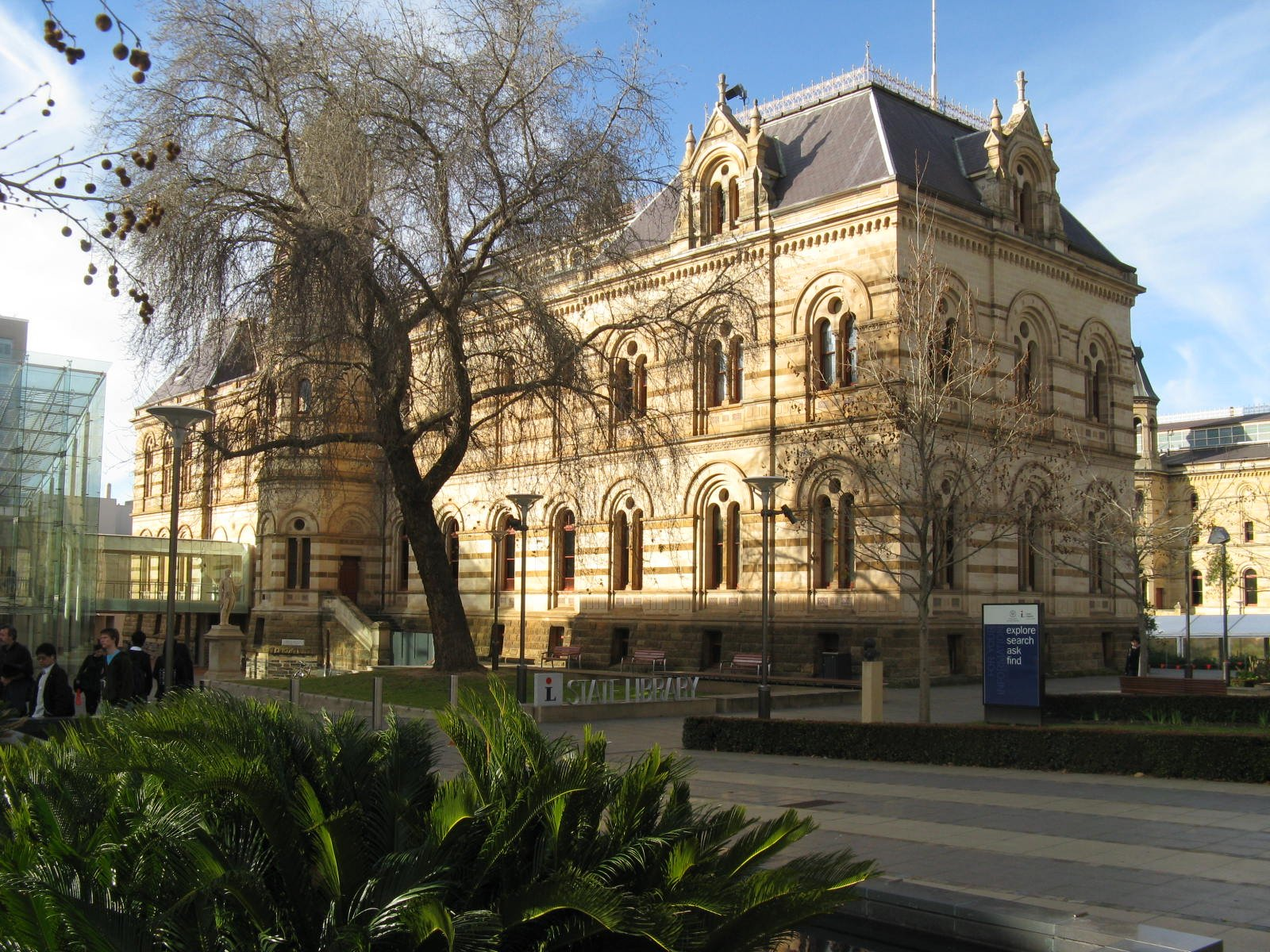
View of the Mortlock Wing, 2008

The State Library of South Australia, or SLSA, formerly known as the Public Library of South Australia, located on North Terrace, Adelaide, is the official library of the Australian state of South Australia. It is the largest public research library in the state, with a collection focus on South Australian information, being the repository of all printed and audiovisual material published in the state, as required by legal deposit legislation. SLSA's holdings include rare books, maps, manuscripts, and ephemera. It holds the "South Australiana" collection, which documents South Australia from pre-European settlement to the present day, as well as general reference material in a wide range of formats, including digital, film, sound and video recordings, photographs, and microfiche.

As of October 2025, the director of the library is Megan Berghuis, who was appointed in 2024, after the retirement of Geoff Strempel.

The library collection was based on a number of forerunning societies and subscription libraries, until the South Australian Institute was incorporated in 1855, and a new building opened in 1861 to house the Institute's collection of books. The Institute Building opened in 1861. The Institute became a statutory body named the Public Library, Museum and Art Gallery in 1884, the year that the first purpose-built library building opened – now the Mortlock Chamber, designed by colonial architect E. J. Woods. In 1967 the Bastyan Wing was opened behind the Institute building, and finally in 2003, the glass-foyered Spence Wing, which connected the Bastyan Wing to the Mortlock Wing. The Institute Building and the Mortlock Wing have been state-heritage listed. In August 2025, the library was ranked second in a global literary tourism initiative called "1000 Libraries".

== History and governance ==
=== 19th century ===
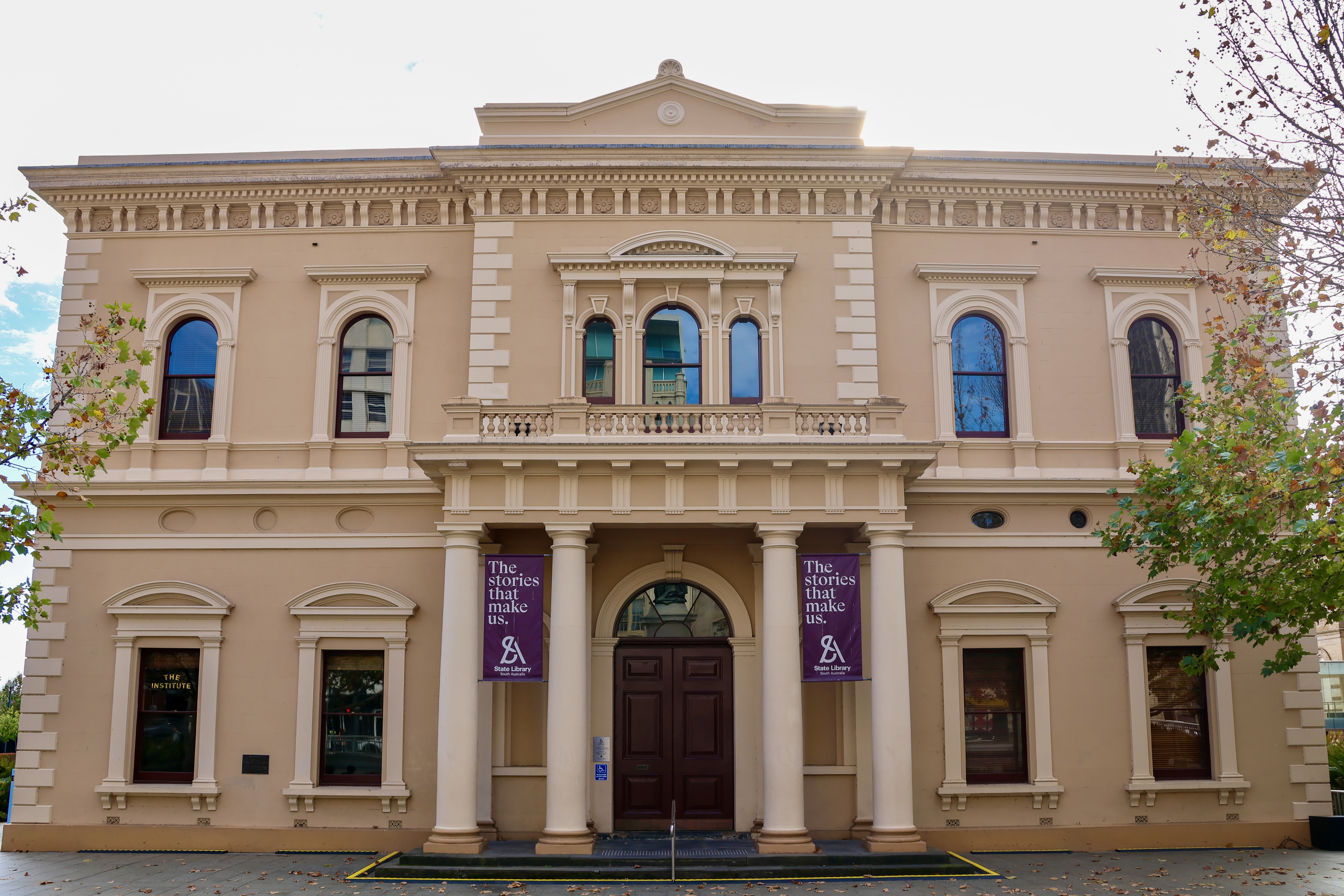
The 1861 Institute Building, home of the library before construction of the Mortlock Wing

On 29 August 1834, a couple of weeks after the passing of the South Australia Act 1834 by the British parliament, a London-based group led by the Colonial Secretary, Robert Gouger, and solicitor Richard Hanson and a number of prominent colonists, including Ernest Giles, Edward Gibbon Wakefield, John Morphett, Robert Torrens Snr, and John Hindmarsh, formed the South Australian Literary Association at the city's Adelphi Chambers. Within a month, the title was changed to the more inclusive South Australian Literary and Scientific Association. This change aimed for "the cultivation and diffusion of useful knowledge throughout the colony". Although the Association lapsed and meetings ceased, a collection of books had been donated by members with the intention of becoming the basis of the new colony's library, and the colonists subsequently brought the collection to the Colony of South Australia aboard the Tam O'Shanter which arrived on 18 December 1836.

The first Adelaide Mechanics' Institute (based on the concept of mechanics' institutes developed in Scotland and England in the 1820s, to provide adult education to working men) met on 23 June 1838, with the event reported by the Southern Australian newspaper. Running into difficulties, the organisation was merged with a revived Literary and Scientific Association, with the new name of the Adelaide Literary and Scientific Association and Mechanics' Institute, electing a committee in July 1839. Over this time, the membership of the association varied between upper-middle-class and lower-middle-class. The library reopened, but the Institute did not have a permanent location, and the focus was on a programme of lectures. However the lectures dwindled and attendances varied, as the Institute tried to function as an adult education institution as well as a learned scientific society, and its last meeting was held in June 1844.

In September 1844, a group of men founded the South Australian Subscription Library, with a collection created by donation and subscriptions, and in 1845 it took over the collection of the Literary and Scientific Association and Mechanics' Institute. A permanent librarian was employed at this time, and the library served its middle-class members.

In 1847, a new Adelaide Mechanics' Institute was founded, by a group of lower-middle class men, led by schoolteacher W. A. Cawthorne. Various talks, discussions and displays were put on. This organisation merged with the South Australian Library in 1848, creating the Mechanics' Institute and South Australian Library, based in Peacock's Buildings, Hindley Street, and with membership moving back to the upper-middle class. Nathaniel Summers was appointed as the first librarian. It subsequently moved to Exchange Chambers, King William Street, but by 1855 had gone into decline.

Meanwhile, other institutes and societies were established throughout the Adelaide suburbs, including the Adelaide Philosophical Society (which later evolved into the Royal Society of South Australia). Some of these institutes asked the government for financial assistance, and Unitarian publisher John Howard Clark suggested the conversion of the Institute into a public institution. A Bill was proposed in Parliament in 1854. Between 1847 and 1856 another 13 mechanics' institutes started in other parts of the colony.

In June 1856 the South Australian Legislative Council passed Act No. 16 of 1855–6, the South Australian Institute Act, which incorporated the South Australian Institute under the control of a Board of Governors, to whose ownership all materials belonging to the old Library and Mechanics' Institute was immediately transferred. This Act also ensured the library would be open to the public free of charge, and granted funding was allocated to it. This made the library very popular particularly amongst artisans and workmen who filled it to capacity in the evenings. At this point it was a lending library, and held a large amount of fictional work. The Act also provided for a museum as part of the new organisation. The suburban institutes became subsidiaries of the SA Institute, as did the Adelaide Philosophical Society and the South Australian Society of Arts.

As new books arrived from Britain, the library expanded and soon needed new accommodation, which was found in North Terrace in 1860. The Adelaide Institute building opened in January 1861, and included rooms for the Adelaide Philosophical Society, the Medical Society and the Choral Society.

The Copyright Act 1878, Part II section 15, required that a copy of every book published in South Australia was to be deposited in the Institute by a process known as legal deposit, for preservation of the books. (After Federation, the Copyright Act (1905) replaced the earlier state copyright legislation with regard to legal deposit, but the State Library continues to collect and preserve locally produced material.)

The Public Library, Museum and Art Gallery Act 1884 renamed the South Australian Institute as Public Library, Museum and Art Gallery, and also broadened the scope of the Board's control to include the expanding network of regional and suburban institutes. It also created a new, independent body, the Adelaide Circulating Library, to take over the business of circulating books on a subscription basis. It also became the location for university lectures.

=== 20th century ===
The next important piece of legislation affecting SLSA was the 1939 number 44 Libraries and Institutes Act, which repealed the Public library, Museum and Art Gallery and Institutes Act and separated the Public Library from the (newly named) Art Gallery of South Australia and South Australian Museum, established its own board and changed its name to the Public Library of South Australia. The new entity thus became a statutory corporation.

Various reorganisations occurred through the years following, but the legislation still governing the Library is number 70 Libraries Act (1982), which repealed the Libraries and Institutes Act (1939–1979) and the Libraries (Subsidies) Act 1955–1977 (with the latest version as of July 2019 being 12 May 2011).

During the 1990s, the Library became a Division under a series of departments, responsible to the Minister for the Arts. The State Records Act 1997 separated the responsibility for management and disposal of state government records, bringing this under a State Records Council rather than the Libraries Board.

=== 21st century ===
From 2001, the library became part of the Division of Arts SA, which was part of the Department of the Premier and Cabinet, continuing to report to the Minister for the Arts.

After the election of the Marshall government in March 2018, the post of Minister for the Arts ceased to exist, Arts South Australia (as Arts SA was now known) was dismantled and its functions transferred to direct oversight by the Department of Premier and Cabinet, Arts and Culture section.

Geoff Strempel was appointed director of SLSA around 2017, during which time he oversaw increased digital preservation. Before his appointment, he was associate director of the 140 public libraries in South Australia. In this position, he establishment of the One Card Network, linking all of the libraries and facilitating quick and efficient inter-library loans among the public libraries. He was awarded the HCL Anderson Award, the Australian Library and Information Association's highest honour, recognising his outstanding service. By late 2024, SLSA had digitised and uploaded around 2000 pages of newspapers to Trove, the National Library of Australia's website that allows free public access to a large amount of digitised historical documents. The library has also acquired over 100,000 images by renowned local aerial photographer Douglas Darian Smith, as well as film memorabilia from filmmaker Scott Hicks' personal archive. Strempel retires on 18 October 2024, but an exhibition of Hicks' items is already planned for 2025.

After Strempel's retirement on 30 September 2024, Megan Berghuis was appointed director, starting on 4 November 2024. She had been working at the City of Unley for the previous 12 years in various managerial roles, and sits on the Libraries Board of South Australia, where she is chair of the Public Libraries Committee. Berghuis remains director as of October 2025.

== Buildings ==
The library occupies several buildings: the Institute Building (opened 1861), the Mortlock Wing (opened 1884), and the modern linking wing, the Spence Wing, which replaced the Bastyan Wing, opening in 2003.

=== Institute Building ===
The South Australian Institute Building, on the corner of North Terrace and Kintore Avenue, is Adelaide's first cultural centre and the oldest cultural building on North Terrace. Over the years it has been used as a library, art gallery, museum, society meeting place and offices, place of adult education, administration headquarters and information centre. It was designed in Victorian Renaissance style by Colonial Architect Edward Angus Hamilton, who was in 1858 commissioned by the government of the colony to undertake the project. Construction was completed in July 1860, with the official opening taking place on 29 January 1861, presided over by Acting Governor Sir Charles Cooper, the chief justice. It stood alone on North Terrace at that time, and included rooms for the Adelaide Philosophical Society, the Medical Society and the Choral Society. When first opened, the central entrance hallway feature a grand staircase. The ground floor housed the circulating library, a large reading room which also accommodated lectures, with a stage at one end, a coffee room, offices, and a board room. The housekeeper's accommodation was at the rear. Meeting rooms occupied the first floor, along with a 21.3 metres (70 ft) long room for the art gallery and museum, lit by skylights. Gas lighting was first used, and full electric lighting of the building was not installed until 1921.

After the new Jervois (now Mortlock) Wing was opened in 1884, the art gallery moved into that area.

Extensive expansion took place on the north side under the direction of Superintendent of Public Buildings Charles Edward Owen Smyth, with the new addition opened on 12 June 1907 by Governor Sir George Le Hunte. The new building included a separate two-storey caretaker's residence facing Kintore Avenue, and the North Terrace entrance stairway was relocated to the new extension.

In 1965, the Royal Geographical Society's rooms were converted into a lecture theatre, after the society relocated to the Jervois Wing. The State Library continues to control and use the building, but it has been home to a number of other organisations, including the Institutes' Association of South Australia (1912–80), the Women's Information Switchboard (1978–97), the Women's Studies Resource Centre (1979–84), the History Trust of South Australia (1981–97), and the Friends of the State Library of South Australia (2007–). The Bradman Collection was exhibited in the building (1998–2008) before being rehoused at the Adelaide Oval.

The State Library has always hosted lectures of various kinds, which have been held in three different locations over time:

- Reading Room, ground floor, 1856-1906
- Lecture Room, first floor, 1907-1967
- Lecture Theatre, ground floor since 1967 – since 2006 called the Anne and Basil Hetzel Lecture Theatre (named for medical researcher Basil Hetzel and his wife Anne)

As of 2025, the Institute Building is still home to and provides exhibition space for the South Australian Society of Arts, and the Anne and Basil Hetzel Lecture Theatre as well as meeting rooms in the building are regularly hired for various events.

The Institute Building was listed on the South Australian Heritage Register on 24 July 1980.

=== Mortlock Chamber ===
The building now known as the Mortlock Chamber has formerly been known as the Jervois Wing and Mortlock Wing.

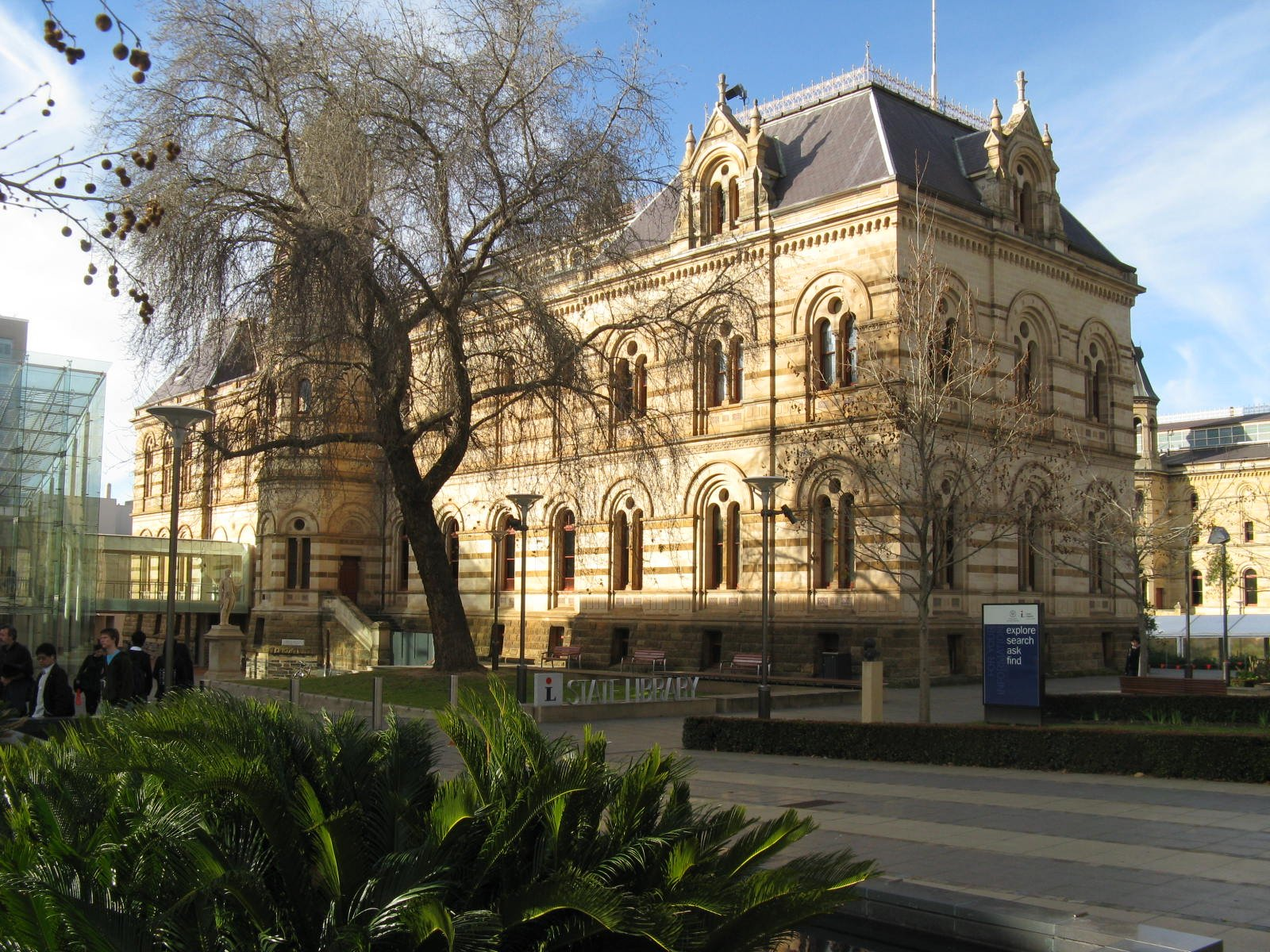
Mortlock Wing

The building was designed by colonial architect E. J. Woods, who amended an earlier design by R. G. Thomas. The foundation stone was laid on 7 November 1879 by Sir William Jervois and the building was constructed by Brown and Thompson at a total cost of £36,395 (valued at GBP 5,779,512.24 roughly A$12,065,787.56 accounted for today's inflation) and opened in 1884. Supervision for the board of directors was undertaken by secretary Robert Kay (1825–1904), later general director and secretary of the Public Library, Museum, and Art Gallery of South Australia.

The building was opened on 18 December 1884 by the Governor of South Australia, Sir William Robinson, as a "Public Library, Museum and Art Gallery for the colony of South Australia" with 23,000 books and a staff of three employees. It had taken over 18 years to complete after the initial foundations were laid in 1866. (In 1873 the foundations of the western wing of a proposed new block were laid, but there the matter ended until 1876 when new plans were drawn, and another set of foundations put in. Again, the work went no further until 1879 when the west wing was finally commenced. The earlier work was condemned, and had to be removed before the Public Library could be started.)

The building is French Renaissance in style with a mansard roof. The walls are constructed of brick with Sydney freestone facings, with decorations in the darker shade of Manoora stone. The interior has two galleries, the first supported by masonry columns, and the second by cast iron brackets. The balconies feature wrought iron balustrading ornamented with gold, while the glass-domed roof allows the chamber to be lit with natural light. Two of the original gas "sunburner" lamps survive in the office space located on the second floor at the southern end.

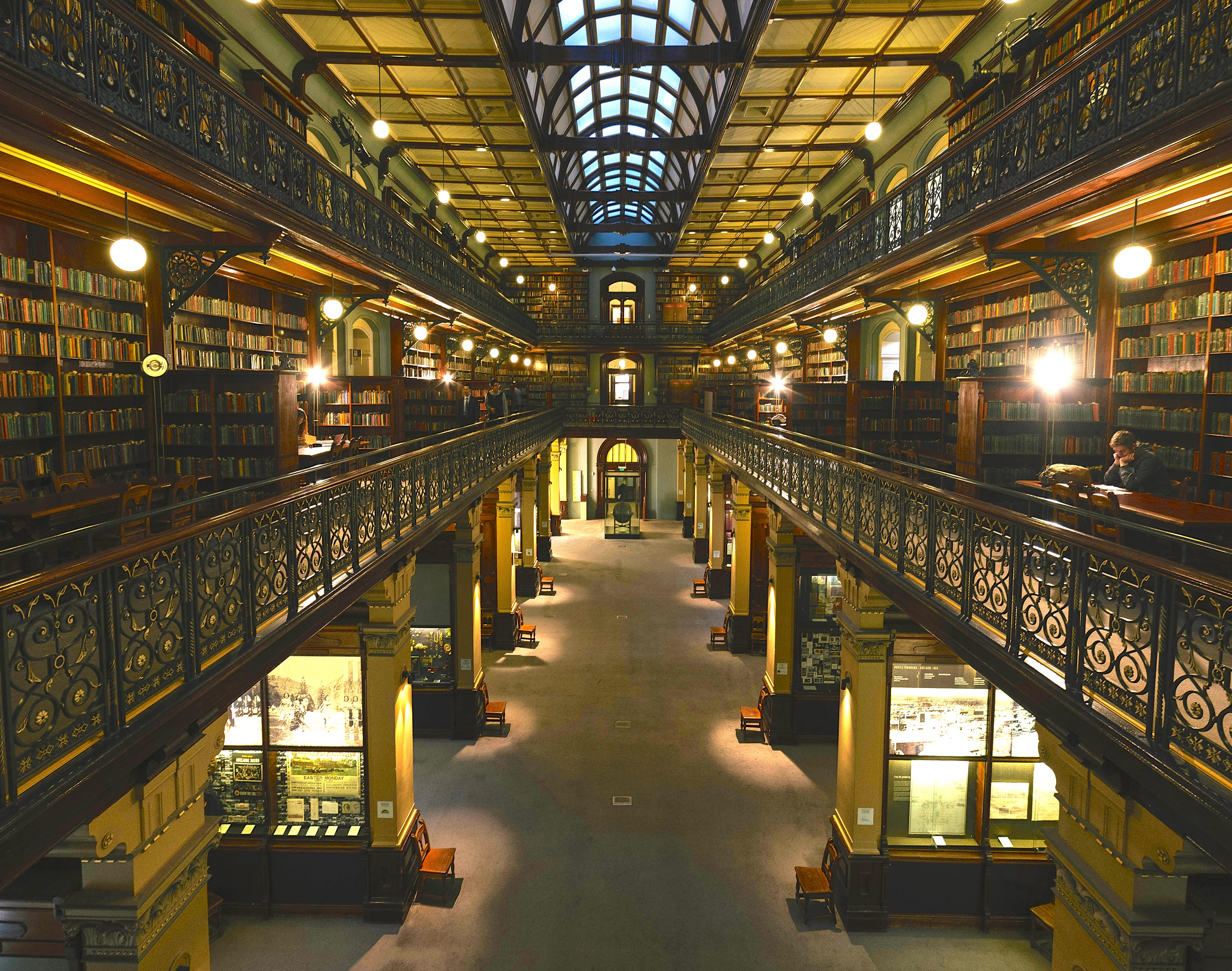
Mortlock Chamber interior, view looking south, 2014

In 1887, a large clock, made by British clockmaker Dent (which made the Big Ben clock in London) and commissioned by library board member Charles Todd, was installed in the library. As of October 2025 it still keeps perfect time, and is wound once a week.

In 1965, the building was renamed the Jervois Wing, when the foundation stone of the new Bastyan Wing was laid, and the library's name was changed to the State Library when the Bastyan Wing opened in 1967.

Restoration of the building occurred in 1984–1985 as a Jubilee 150 project by Danvers Architects. Services were upgraded, and the building was reopened in mid-1986 as the Mortlock Library of South Australiana.

In honour of a substantial bequest from John Andrew Tennant Mortlock, the Libraries Board of South Australia resolved that a percentage of the South Australiana Collections would be housed in the wing and named the Mortlock Library of South Australiana in 1986.

After the addition of the Spence Wing in 2003, the Mortlock Chamber has been used mainly for study and for events and exhibitions.

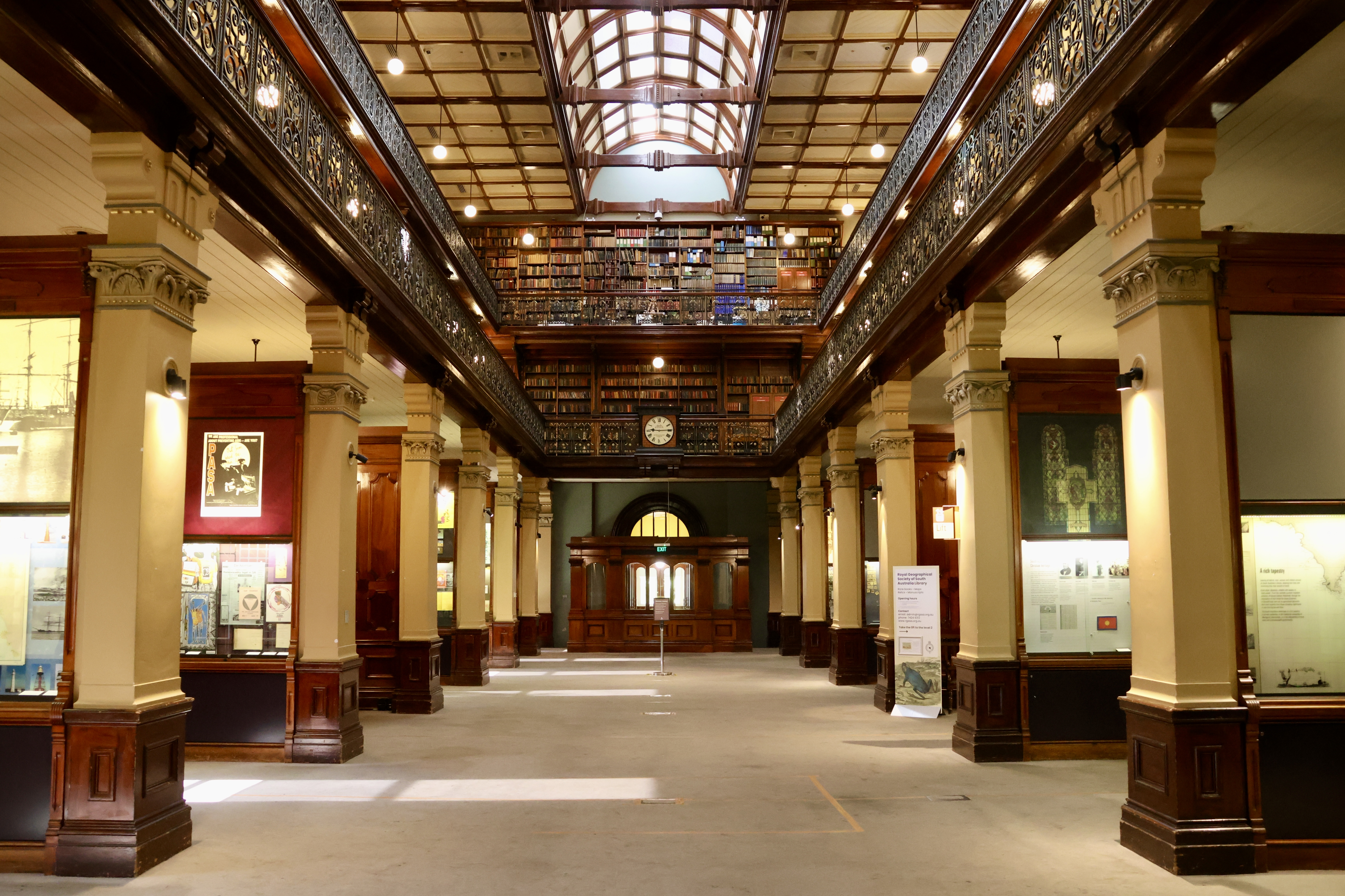
Mortlock Chamber shortly before refurbishment, February 2025

In August 2014, as the Mortlock Wing, it featured in a list of the top 20 most beautiful libraries of the world, compiled by the U.S. magazine Travel + Leisure.

In August 2025, the State Library was ranked second, after Trinity College Dublin Library, in a global literary tourism initiative called "1000 Libraries", based largely on the beauty of the Mortlock Wing. However, the Mortlock Chamber was closed from June 2025 until 3 October 2025 for renovations, led by architecture firm Swanbury Penglase. The floor was levelled, a new carpet laid, and masonry columns on the ground floor underway. Upon the day of reopening, the library provided hourly guided tours of the wing.

The Mortlock Wing was state-heritage-listed on 28 May 1981.

=== Bastyan Wing ===
The Bastyan Wing was designed by the government project architect Peter Sharp and built by F. Fricker, with construction taking around two and a half years. The foundation stone was unveiled at a ceremony on 27 August 1965, attended by chairman of the Libraries Board of South Australia, Donald McFarling, Sir Edric Bastyan, his wife Lady Bastyan, and Minister for Education, Ron Loveday. It was announced at the ceremony that the original building (now Mortlock) would be renamed the Jervois Wing.

The building, which cost over $3 million to build, has exterior cladding of South Australian marble and granite, and in the interior of the main entrance there is Italian marble from Carrara. It was officially opened on 25 May 1967 by the Premier of South Australia, Frank Walsh, at which time the library was renamed State Library of South Australia (formerly Public Library of South Australia). The building provided 158,000 ft^{2} (14,700 m^{2}) over three floors, but provision was made for an extension building upwards, as it was anticipated that space would soon run out.

The Bastyan Wing was named after Sir Edric Montague Bastyan (1903-1980), who had a very successful military career before becoming Governor of South Australia from 1961 until 1968.

=== Spence Wing ===
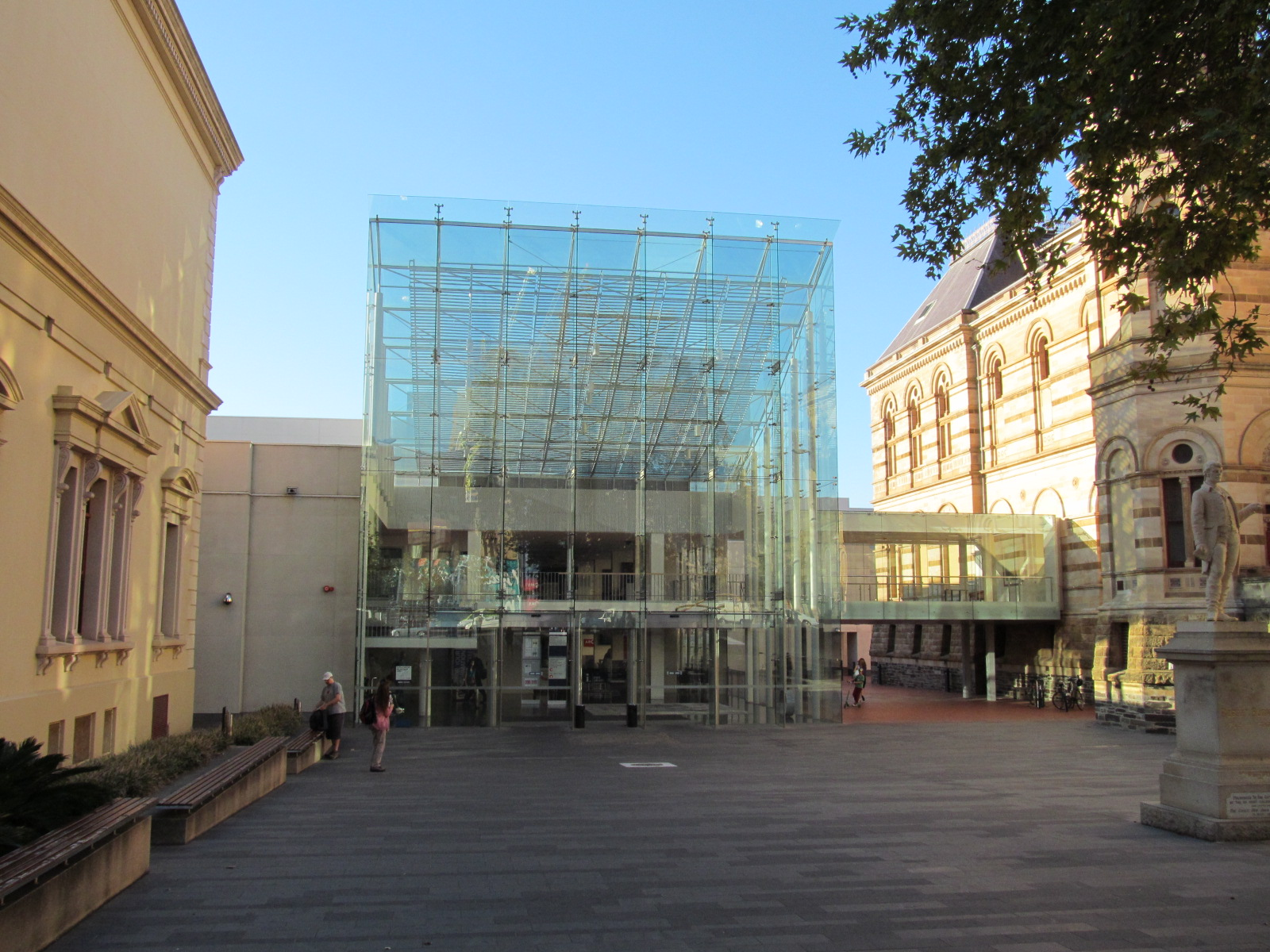
Spence Wing, 2012

A redevelopment project was undertaken in the early 2000s to completely refurbish the Bastyan Wing, and to link the two older library buildings, the Mortlock and Institute buildings. The state government engaged the architecture firms Hassell and Mitchell/Giurgola to design the project; the latter had designed the new Parliament House in Canberra. Built Environs were the chief building contractors.

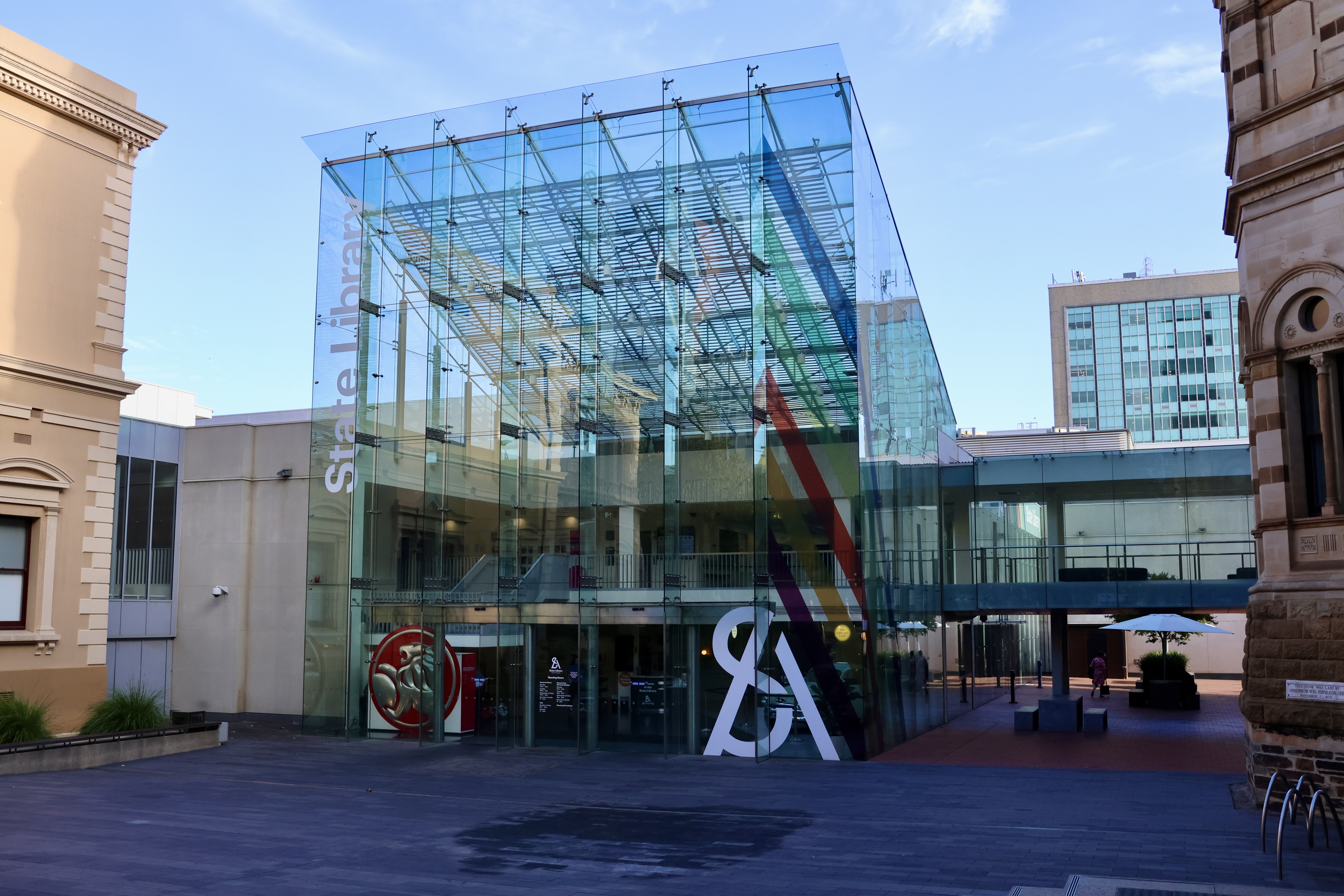
Spence Wing, February 2025

The Spence Wing replaced the Bastyan Wing and provided a new entrance to the library through the old Institute building, made mostly of glass. Care was taken to integrate the modern and heritage elements of the building. The entry structure consists of glass fin-supported walls and roof. A bridge with glass walls connects the new wing to the old building. The Spence Wing serves to integrate the library into the rest of the North Terrace cultural precinct, which includes the University of Adelaide and stretches down to the River Torrens. New windows were added, overlooking Government House to the west, the Migration Museum to the south, and the South Australian Museum and Art Gallery of South Australia to the east.

The Spence Wing opened to the public on 14 July 2003, with its official opening taking place on 15 October 2003, presided over by the Premier of South Australia (Mike Rann) and Rupert Murdoch. Special guests included Pantijiti McKenzie and a group of Aboriginal women from Ernabella Arts. The Spence Wing is named after writer and social activist Catherine Helen Spence.

As part of the 2003 redevelopment, the glazed walkway reconnecting the Spence Wing of the State Library to the Mortlock Wing was named the Bastyan Walkway.

== Collections and rooms ==
=== Bray Reference Library ===
The general reference and research material in the State Library was named the Bray Reference Library in 1987 after former SA Chief Justice, John Jefferson Bray, who served on the Libraries Board of South Australia from 1944 to 1987.

The Bray Study Rooms are on Level 1 of the Spence Wing.

=== South Australiana ===
The State Library has a national responsibility to collect, preserve and give access to historical and contemporary South Australian information. The South Australiana collections document South Australia from pre-white settlement to the present day, and the Northern Territory to 1911. The South Australiana collection is one of the most comprehensive in the world due to legal deposit requirements for published material, and through donations of unpublished material. A well-known donation is the Bradman Collection of cricketing memorabilia.

There is a reading room for accessing archival collections on Level 1 of the Spence Wing, formerly known as the heritage reading room. In 2003 it was renamed to the Somerville Reading Room (or Mabel Somerville Reading Room), in honour of Mabel Somerville, whose bequests in memory of her father James Dugald Somerville contributed greatly to the South Australiana collections.

=== York Gate Geographical and Colonial Library ===
The York Gate Library was acquired from the estate of Stephen William Silver, of S. W. Silver and Co. (William) a London-based company who not only sold clothing, furniture and equipment suitable for emigrants to the British Colonies, but also a series books providing relevant information for such emigrants. William had started to collect objects and books related to the areas to which their customers were migrating. These were kept in his residence at 3 York Gate, London and hence became known as the York Gate Library. When he died on 7 March 1905, the South Australia branch of the Royal Geographical Society of Australasia raised the money to buy the collection of nearly 5,000 volumes and pamphlets so they could be brought to Australia. In 2006, the centenary of the establishment of the library in Australia, the collection was threatened with eviction.

=== Mountford-Sheard Collection ===
The Mountford-Sheard Collection is a collection of journals, sound recordings and other works created, written and gathered by Charles P. Mountford, which has been inscribed on UNESCO's Memory of the World. It is of great cultural significance to Aboriginal Australians, particularly those in central Australia, the Flinders Ranges (Adnyamathanha people), Arnhem Land (Yolngu people) and the Tiwi Islands (Tiwi people), and the material is respectful of the people whose lives it documents.

=== Ron Boland Newspaper Reading Area ===
The Ron Boland Newspaper Reading Area was named in honour of journalist, sports writer, editor, and managing director Ron Boland. Funding for the area was provided by Newscorp head Rupert Murdoch and former managing director of Advertiser Newspapers Peter Wylie, who donated A$400,000 to the State Library Foundation Appeal.

=== Children's Literature Research Collection ===
The Children's Literature Research Collection (CLRC) is a research and reference collection. It was formed in 1959 and includes over 66,000 (as of 2025) books, periodicals, comics, board and table games, and toys. It is one of the State Library's heritage collections and is of international importance. Not all items have been catalogued yet.

The collection has been enhanced by donations from South Australian individuals and families and from organisations seeking to fund one of Australia's largest children's collection, including:

- Gilbert Collection and Lucy Collection, each comprising books, toys, and games from the 19th and early 20th centuries that were donated by the Gilbert and Lucy families to the library during the 1960s and 1980s
- A large donation of 19th-century toys and books by the Crompton family in the 1990s
- The Unitarian Church Children's Library, comprising around 700 books dating from 1859 onwards, donated in 1990 by the Unitarian Church of South Australia
- Around 160 board games donated by the National Trust of New South Wales in 2000
- More than 300 titles donated by Perdita Eldridge, granddaughter of Sir Josiah Symon in 2012, including books from her personal library as well as from her mother's school, known as the Inn Nursery School

In April 2022, a dedicated space for families with children to come to read stories and play together, engage in creative activities, and attend programs and events for children, was created in the Institute buildings. The space was named the Mem Fox Space, in honour of beloved Adelaide children's author Mem Fox.

=== Rare books and other collections ===
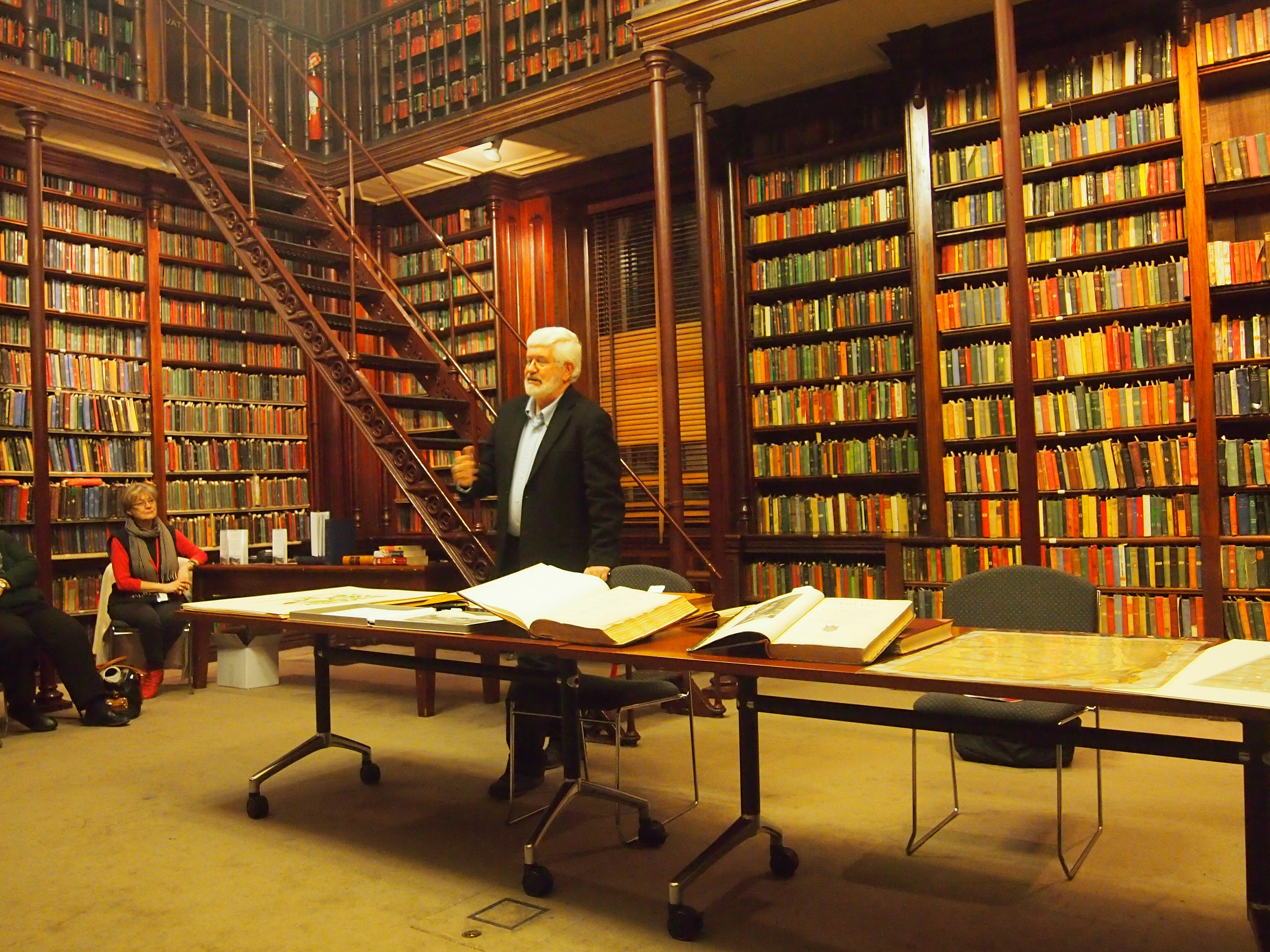
Using items from its rare books collection, Keith Conlon gives a talk on the 200th anniversary of the death of Matthew Flinders, at the SLSA's Institute Building, 21 July 2014.

The State Library's rare books collection is the major collection of its kind in South Australia. It comprises Australian and international items which have been identified as having a special interest through subject matter or rarity.

The Thomas Hardy Wine Library is located on Level 1 of the Spence Wing.

== Collaborations ==
=== Centre of Democracy ===
The Library manages, in collaboration with the History Trust of South Australia, the Centre of Democracy on the corner of North Terrace and Kintore Avenue. The Centre's gallery exhibits treasures from History Trust and State Library collections, as well as items on loan from State Records of South Australia, the Art Gallery of South Australia, the Courts Authority, Parliament House, Government House and private lenders.

=== National edeposit system (NED) ===
As a member library of National and State Libraries Australia, the organisation collaborated on the creation of the National edeposit (NED) system, which enables publishers from all over Australia to upload electronic publications as per the 2016 amendment to the Copyright Act 1968 and other regional legislation relating to legal deposit, and makes these publications publicly accessible online (depending on access conditions) from anywhere via Trove.

== See also ==
- South Australian Museum
- Art Gallery of South Australia
- State Library of New South Wales
- State Library of Queensland
- State Library of Victoria
- State Library of Western Australia
- State Library of Tasmania
