= MARS Group =

Defunct British architectural think tank

The Modern Architectural Research Group, or MARS Group, was a British architectural think tank founded in 1933 by several prominent architects and architectural critics of the time involved in the British modernist movement. The MARS Group came after several previous but unsuccessful attempts at creating an organization to support modernist architects in Britain such as those that had been formed on continental Europe, like the Union des Artistes Modernes in France.

The group first formed when Sigfried Giedion of the Congrès International d'Architecture Moderne asked Morton Shand to assemble a group that would represent Britain at their events. Shand, along with Wells Coates, chose Maxwell Fry and F. R. S. Yorke as the founding members. They were also joined by a few members of architectural group Tecton, by Ove Arup and by John Betjeman, a poet and contributor to Architectural Review. In 1936, Tecton members William Tatton Brown, his wife Aileen and the proprietor of Architectural Press, Hubert de Cronin Hastings, formed a three-strong 'Town Planning Committee' within CIAM exploring ideas related to 'linear cities'; Tatton Brown subsequently presented a paper based on the work, The Theory of Contacts and its Application to the Future of London, at the CIAM V Congress in Paris in September 1937. However, this work was subsequently regarded as a "a preliminary survey of London by a section of the MARS Group", and a new and larger Town Planning Committee was convened under Arthur Korn's leadership in December 1937 to produce what turned out to be a heavily revised plan for London.

The group's greatest success came in 1938 with a show at the New Burlington Galleries, but it also left them in debt. The MARS group proposed a radical plan for the redevelopment of postwar London, the details of which were published the Architectural Review in 1942. At its height there were about 58 members in the group. The group itself began to lose steam along with the movement and many members left as a result of creative differences. The group finally disbanded in 1957.

== The MARS Plan for London ==
"The plan for London issued by the Mars Group (the English wing of CIAM) and prepared by their Town Planning Committee was a marked contrast to anything that had gone before and, anything produced subsequently. It was frankly Utopian and Socialistic in concept." Dennis Sharp, 1971.

The plan was devised by what has been described as a 'small and devoted' group, under the town planning sub committee of MARS, chaired by Korn, and including Arthur Ling, Maxwell Fry, the latter who worked as secretary, and fellow Jewish emigre, engineer Felix Samuely. Arthur Korn is described as having been 'the main spring of the enterprise' and as providing an 'infectious enthusiasm' that drove the project forward. Influenced by the Soviet urbanist Miliutin, the plan essentially conceived the centre of the city remaining much the same but with a series of linear forms or tongues extending from the Thames, described as like a herring bone, composed of social units and based around the rail network. Habitation in each social unit was to consist mainly of flats and owed much to Le Corbusier's notion of the unite d'habitation. Described as 'unworkable' by Dennis Sharp, in his 1971 essay on the plan, he concedes it 'was not a concrete scheme but a concept that would by its very nature produce interpretations'. Marmaras and Sutcliffe argue the plan 'saw London almost entirely in terms of movement ...[being] presented primarily as a centre of exchange and communications'. Moughtin and Shirley (1995) note that one of the aims of the plan was to promote public transport, where with railways integral to planning, the 'need for cars will be few'.

Korn's initial chairmanship of the plan was interrupted by his 18-month internment in the Isle of Man from 1939, being a German citizen, during which period work on the plan fizzled out. On his release, in 1941, work recommenced, an exhibition of the plan was organised and a 'description and analysis' was published under the joint authorship of Arthur Korn and Felix Samuely in the Architectural Association journal in 1942.
