= H. de C. Hastings =

Hubert de Cronin Hastings
- Born: 18 July 1902; Merton, Surrey, England
- Died: 4 December 1986 (aged 84); Fittleworth, Sussex, England
- Occupation: Architectural editor

Hubert de Cronin Hastings (18 July 1902 – 4 December 1986), often referred to in contemporary works as H. de C. Hastings (and known to friends as "H. de C."), was chairman of the Architectural Press and editor of Architectural Review and Architects' Journal.

== Early life and family ==
Hastings was born at Merton, Surrey, on 18 July 1902, the third son of Percy Hastings, proprietor of Architectural Press and founder of Architectural Review, and his wife Lilian Julie, née Bass. He was educated at Berkhamsted School, and worked first for his father's company before enrolling at Bartlett School of Architecture, part of University College, London. Disenchanted with the course's beaux arts leanings, he moved to UCL's art school, the Slade, where he was influenced heavily by cubism.

On 23 July 1927, Hastings married Hazel Rickman Garrard, a daughter of Charles Frederick Garrard and had two children with her: a son, John Hastings, and a daughter, Priscilla Hastings.

== Early years as editor ==
In 1927, Hastings took over (alongside Christian Berman) the editing of Architectural Review and Architects' Journal; he set about rearranging the format, including changes in typography and image (for which he commissioned artwork from Eric Gill), but also the content. From then on, the weekly Journal would be concerned with practical architecture, while the monthly Review was concerned with architecture as an art, regularly featuring articles on painting, sculpture, interior design and architectural history.

In the following years, he employed a new generation of writers to contribute to the publications, including Osbert Lancaster, Robert Byron, Evelyn Waugh, Cyril Connolly, Sacheverell Sitwell, P. Morton Shand and (from 1930) John Betjeman; during the Second World War, Nikolaus Pevsner assisted, while J. M. Richards was serving in the armed forces. Hastings was known to have had difficult working relationships with some of these young writers he employed. Betjeman's relationship with Hastings was largely amicable, though at times, as Hasting's Telegraph obituary states, "Betjeman was openly impatient of the petty rules imposed by the management" and nicknamed him "Old Obscurity".

Although rarely contributing articles, he is known to have written several, under the pseudonym Ivor de Wolfe. He also authored The Alternative Society (1980), as well as a caricature book produced during his art-school years. As an individual, he was a "romantic" and an "idealist", but also a "perfectionist." He rarely talked publicly and was known to go on vacations without announcement and miss editorial meetings, returning, though, with a new draft article or photographs of continental cities.

== CIAM ==
During the late 1930s Hastings contributed to the work of the International Congress of Modern Architecture (CIAM). In 1936, with William Tatton Brown and his wife Aileen, Hastings formed a three-strong 'Town Planning Committee' within CIAM exploring ideas related to 'linear cities'; Tatton Brown subsequently presented a paper based on the work, The Theory of Contacts and its Application to the Future of London, at the CIAM V Congress in Paris in September 1937. These ideas were then explored further through the MARS Group and its exhibition at the New Burlington Galleries in 1938.

== Later years and legacy ==
Throughout the 1930s, he promoted modernism, with the Oxford Dictionary of National Biography commenting that he "saw the logic of this as a bright new future for society", although he later campaigned for 'new monumentalism' and 'new empiricism', before going on to favour the "picturesque" in town planning, in reaction to the more rigid axial-planning which was fashionable at the time amongst architectural circles; this led to his promotion of the notion of "townscape" and his criticism of poor planning in British architecture. A special publication of the Review which highlighted his criticisms was produced and influenced the creation of the Civic Trust.

In recognition of his service to architecture in Britain, he became the first architectural editor to receive the Royal Gold Medal for Architecture from the Royal Institute of British Architects. Their citation described him as a "leading campaigner in drawing attention to many of the most crucial and controversial issues that have concerned the architectural profession in this century."

Hastings died on 4 December 1986 at Bedham Farm, Fittleworth, Sussex; he was cremated and his ashes interred at Bedham.
