= Felix Samuely =

Austrian-born British structural engineer

Felix James Samuely (3 February 1902 – 22 January 1959) was an Austrian-British structural engineer.

== Biography ==
Samuely was born into a Jewish family in Vienna on 3 February 1902. His father was a medical practitioner, and he had a younger sister. In 1919, he matriculated in science at the Kaiser-Friedrich-Gymnasium in Berlin. He graduated with a Diplom-Ingenieur degree from the Technische Hochschule Berlin-Charlottenburg in 1923, having written his thesis on the design of a reinforced concrete bridge.

== Career ==
Samuely immigrated to Britain in 1933. He worked as a consultant engineer and collaborated with Erich Mendelsohn and Serge Chermayeff on the De La Warr Pavilion at Bexhill-on-Sea (1935). This project was notable for its use of welded steel construction.

He played a significant role in the Festival of Britain in 1951, where he was responsible for the structural design of the Skylon and the Transport Pavilion. He also designed the structure for the British Pavilion at the Brussels World's Fair in 1958.

In 1942, Samuely published the MARS plan for London in collaboration with Arthur Korn. He also worked with George Grenfell Baines on several projects that employed the mullion wall concept. He established his own practice, Felix J. Samuely and Partners.

== Death ==
Samuely died on 22 January 1959 in the London Clinic, 20 Devonshire Place, London, following a heart attack. He was survived by his wife and his mother.

== Sources ==
- Newby, Frank (23 September 2004). "Samuely, Felix James (1902–1959), civil engineer". Oxford Dictionary of National Biography (online ed.). Oxford University Press. doi:10.1093/ref:odnb/49340. (Subscription, Wikipedia Library access or UK public library membership required.)
- "Felix James Samuely". Grace's Guide.
