= Little Berkhamsted =

Village in Hertfordshire, England

Coordinates: 51.753123°N 0.131111°W

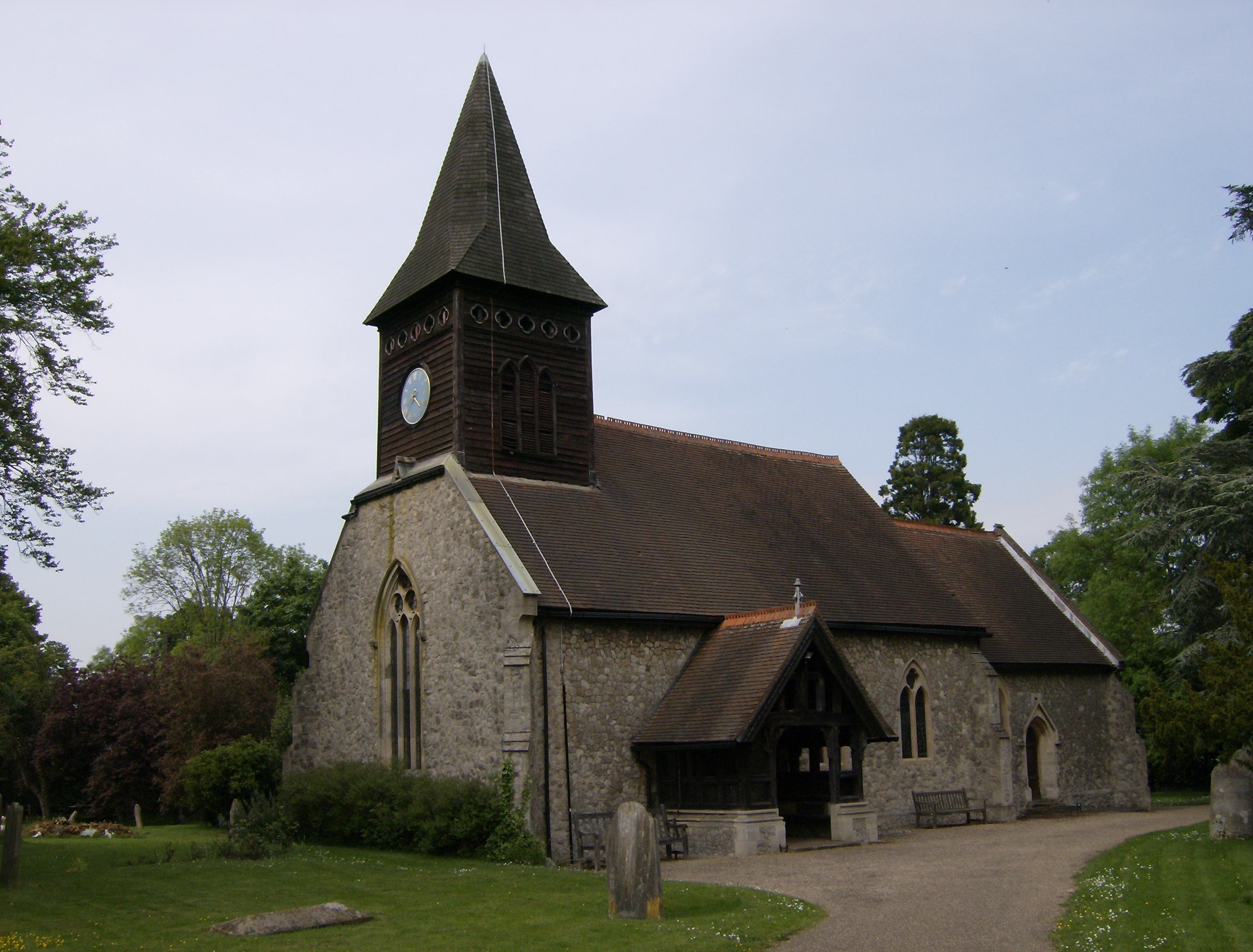
- St Andrews Church, Little Berkhamsted

- Location within Hertfordshire
- Population: 527 (Parish, 2021)
- OS grid reference: TL291077
- District: East Hertfordshire
- Shire county: Hertfordshire
- Region: East
- Country: England
- Sovereign state: United Kingdom
- Post town: HERTFORD
- Postcode district: SG13
- Dialling code: 01707
- Police: Hertfordshire
- Fire: Hertfordshire
- Ambulance: East of England
- UK Parliament: Welwyn Hatfield

Little Berkhamsted is a village and civil parish in the East Hertfordshire district of Hertfordshire, England. It lies 5 miles (8 km) south-west of Hertford, its post town. At the 2021 census the parish had a population of 527.

The village is in a hilly location, some 120 metres (400 feet) above sea level. It has a row of weather-boarded cottages opposite St Andrew's Church. Conservative cabinet minister Reginald Maudling (1917–79) and his widow, Beryl, are buried in the churchyard. Nearby there is an Elizabethan house and 'Stratton's Folly', a 1789 brick tower.

== History ==
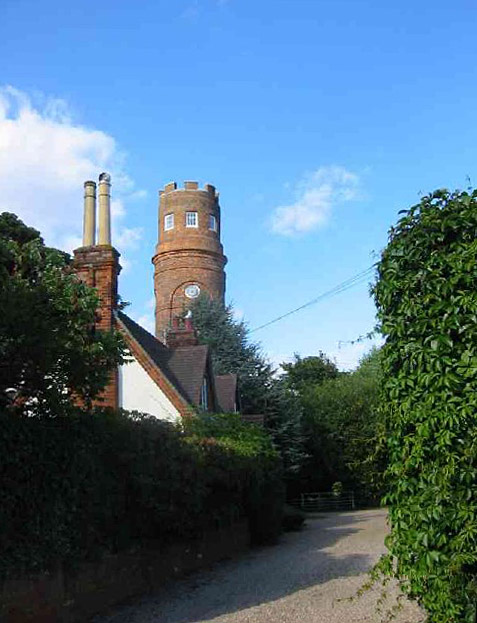
Stratton's Tower

The manor of Little Berkhampstead is mentioned in the Domesday Book as Berchehamstede when it was held by Hardwin de Scales. The Parish Church of St Andrew is faced with Kentish ragstone and has a wooden bell-cote for three bells. The church was first mentioned in the 12th century but was totally rebuilt in 1647, although little from that date survived reconstruction in the 19th century.

Stratton's Tower (also known as "Stratton's Folly") is a five-storey, 97 ft tall observation tower in the village. It was built in 1789 for John Stratton, Gentleman, who lived at "Gay's", since renamed The Gage. Legend has it that John Stratton was a retired Admiral and that he wanted to see ships in the Thames; however, he was a non-conformist and, as such, would have been unable to hold a commission under the Crown and the earliest known reference to the building describes it as a "Prospect Tower". After being derelict for more than 100 years, it was restored and converted to living accommodation in 1971 by William Tatton Brown. It is a Grade II* Listed Building.
