= Mullion =

Architectural element

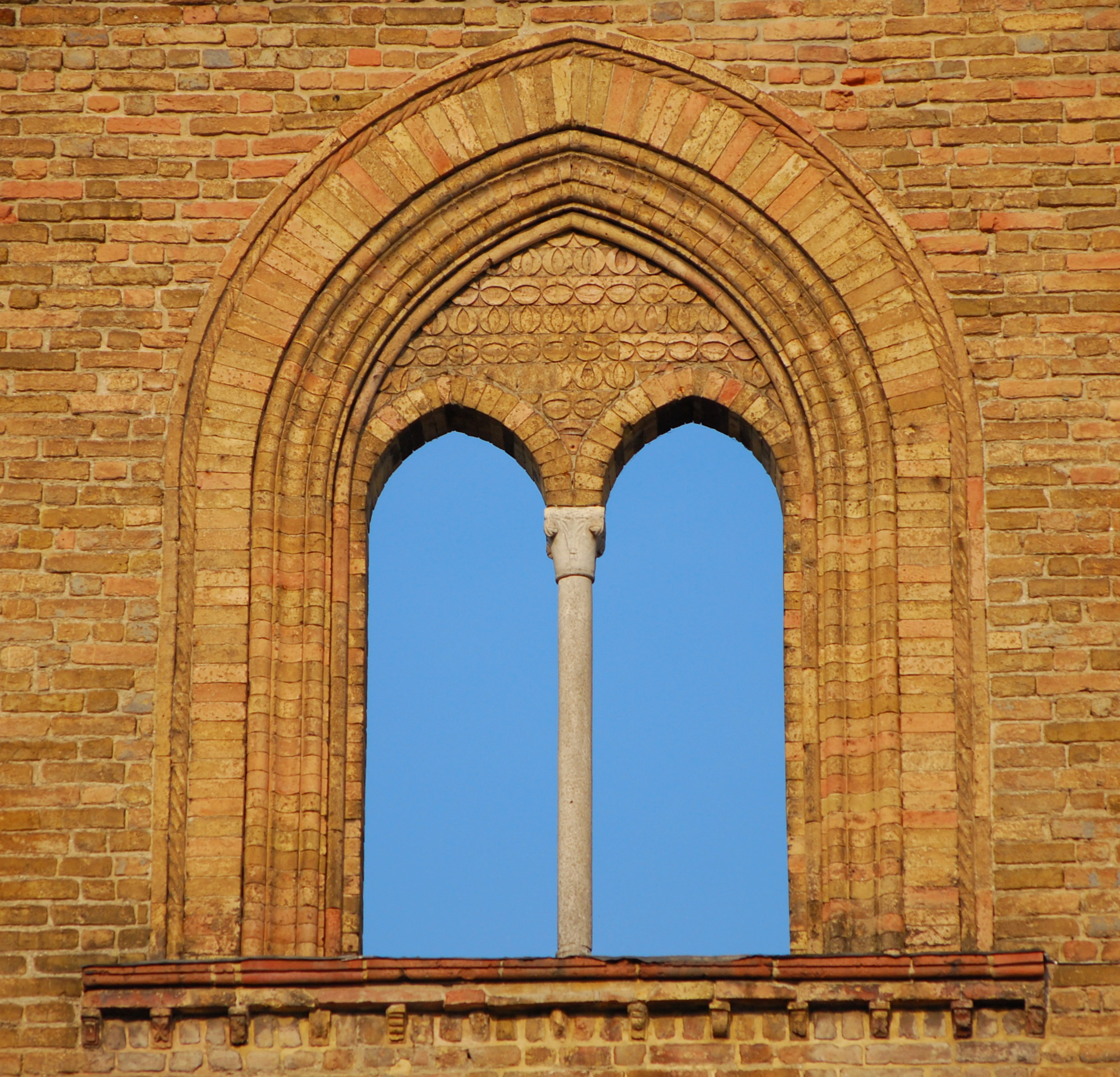
A mullioned window in the church of San Francesco of Lodi, Lombardy

A mullion is the element that forms a division between units of a window or screen, or is used decoratively. When dividing adjacent window units its primary purpose is a rigid support to the glazing of the window. Its secondary purpose is to provide structural support to the horizontal lintel above the window opening (Horizontal elements separating the head of a door from a window above are called transoms). In the case of multiple arched windows combined building a bifora (or trifora, etc), the equally shaped windows might be coupled by mullions (instead of a column with base and capital), framed by a blind arch or the mullions dissolving in Gothic tracery.

== History ==
Stone mullions were used in Armenian, Saxon and Islamic architecture prior to the 10th century. They became a common architectural feature across Europe in early Mediaeval and Romanesque architecture, with biforas, paired windows divided by a column or a mullion, set beneath a single arch. The same structural form was used for open arcades as well as windows, and is found in galleries, porticos and cloisters.

Particularly in Gothic cathedrals and churches, windows became higher and slender (so-called lancet windows), the walls between them diminished to slim stone mullions building large arrangements of multiple openings with ornamental tracery in the arches. Pictorial stained glass (after designs by sculptors or painters) was set in lead and ferramenta between the stone mullions and tracery. Mullioned windows of a simpler form continued to be used into the Renaissance and various Revival styles. Windows with a single mullion, dividing the window into two equal elements are said to be biforate, or to parallel the Italian bifore windows.

== Design ==
Parts of a casement cross-window, viewed from the outside

Mullions may be made of any material, but wood and aluminium are most common, although glass is also used between windows. I. M. Pei used all-glass mullions in his design of JFK Airport's Terminal 6 (National Airlines Sundrome), unprecedented at the time.

Mullions are vertical elements and are often confused with transoms, which lie horizontally. In US parlance, the word is also confused with the "muntin" ("glazing bar" in the UK) which is the precise word for the very small strips of wood or metal that divide a sash into smaller glass "panes" or "lights".

A mullion acts as a structural member, in most applications the mullion transfers wind loads and weight of the glazing and upper levels into the structure below. In a curtain wall screen, however, the mullions only support the weight of the transoms, glass and any opening vents. Also in the case of a curtain wall screen the weight of glazing can be supported from above (providing the structure can take the required loads) this puts the mullions under tension rather than compression.

When a very large glazed area was desired before the middle of the nineteenth century, such as in the large windows seen in Gothic churches or Elizabethan palaces, the openings necessarily required division into a framework of mullions and transoms, often of stone. It was further necessary for each glazed panel, sash or casement to be further subdivided by muntins or lead cames because large panes of glass were reserved primarily for use as mirrors, being far too costly to use for glazing windows or doors.

In traditional designs today, mullions and transoms are normally used in combination with divided-light windows and doors when glazing porches or other large areas.

== See also ==
- Bifora
- Trifora
- Mullion wall
