= Mullion wall =

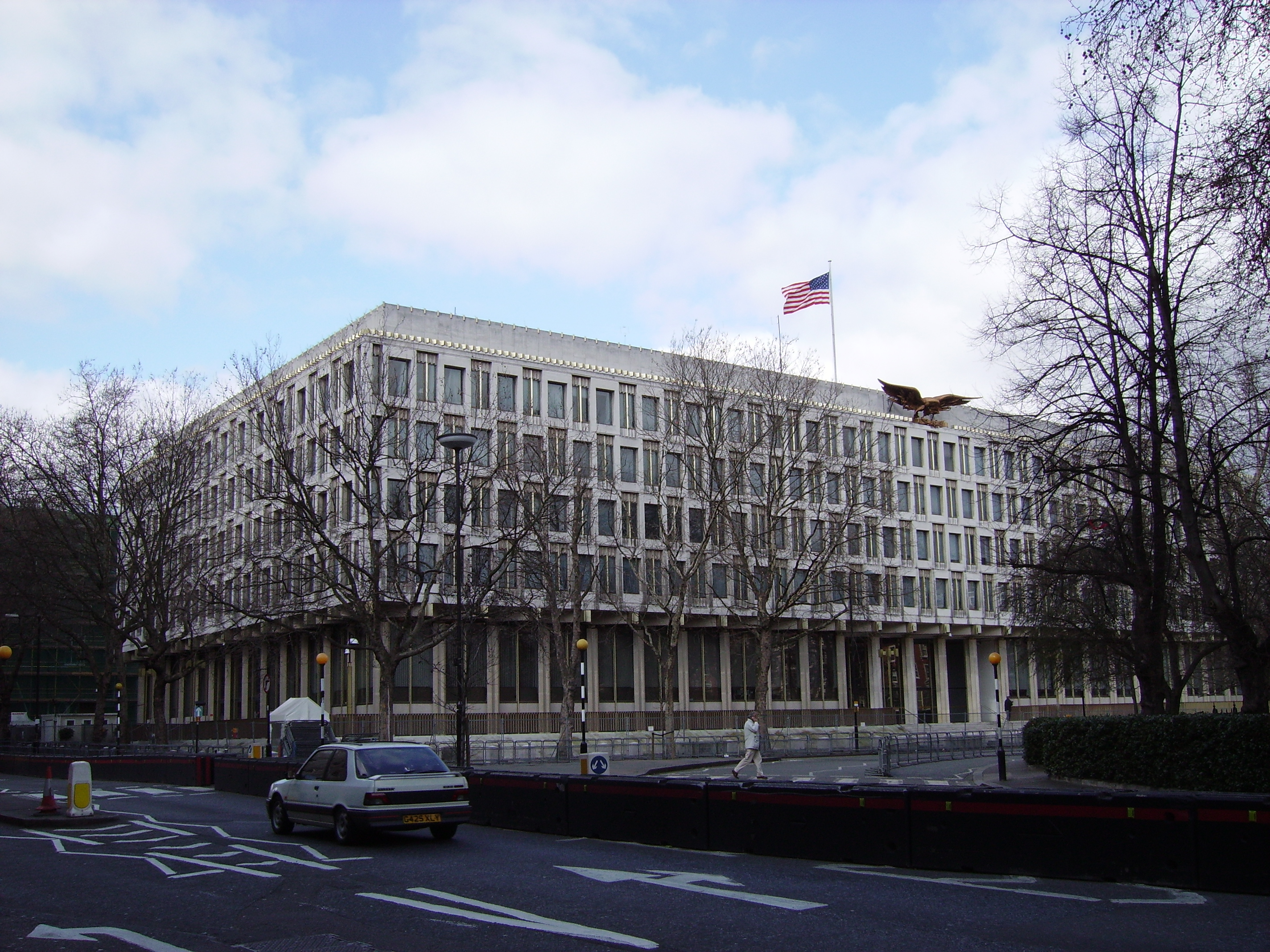
Mullion wall of the US Embassy, London (1955–1960)

A mullion wall (also known as H-frames) is a structural system in which the load of the floor slab is taken by prefabricated panels around the perimeter. Visually, the effect is similar to the stone-mullioned windows of Perpendicular Gothic or Elizabethan architecture. Mullion wall concept was first developed by the engineer Felix Samuely in the 1940s to avoid problems with routing the service runs around the joins of columns and beams. The column pairs with beam in between forming the H are staggered from floor to floor. With floor beams attached to the horizontal part of the H, space on the inside of columns is free to run drainage, etc.

The technology was used by George Grenfell Baines together with Felix Samuely in order to cope with material shortages at the Thomas Linacre School in Wigan (1952). It was refined at the Shell Offices in Stanlow (1956), the Derby Colleges of Technology and Art (1956–1964), and Manchester University's Humanities Building (1961–1967).

While not widely used, a mullion wall approach was adopted by Eero Saarinen at the US Embassy, London (1955–1960), and by Minoru Yamasaki at the World Trade Center, New York (1966–1973).

The staggered layout of the mullion wall creates a checkered look of the facade, frequently accentuated by two-tone paint job, following the maxim "if you cannot be sure of hiding it, emphasise it."

== See also ==
- Curtain wall

== Sources ==
- Pelkonen, Eeva-Liisa (Spring–Summer 2010). "(Un)timely Saarinen". Log (19). Springer: 107–117. JSTOR 41765352.
- "Discussion on 'Services, Structure and Building'". The IHVE Journal (v. 36). Batiste Publications: 113. 1968. "Felix Samuely in the 1940s on the integration of structure and services for technical colleges. What he said interested me greatly. Basically it was about the inevitable complications of service runs following vertical structure wherever column met beam. To overcome the difficulty he said they developed a structure with reinforced concrete columns in pairs, which Samuely called H-frames. Later it became known as the mullion wall. It seems to be rarely used today"
- "Technical College at Kedleston Road, Derby" (PDF). Architects' Journal: 441–452. 17 March 1960.
