= South Australian Literary and Scientific Association =

Forerunner of South Australian Museum and State Library of South Australia

The South Australian Literary and Scientific Association, formerly the South Australian Literary Association and also known as the South Australian Literary Society, was active in London before the British colonisation of South Australia after its establishment on 29 August 1834. The Association played a part in the foundation of the South Australian Museum, the State Library of South Australia and the Royal Society of South Australia.

== History ==
On 29 August 1834, a couple of weeks after the passing of the South Australia Act 1834, a group led by the Colonial Secretary, Robert Gouger, and solicitor Richard Hanson and a number of prominent colonists, including Ernest Giles, Edward Gibbon Wakefield, John Morphett, Robert Torrens Snr, and John Hindmarsh formed the South Australian Literary Association in Adelphi Chambers, London. Within a month, the title was changed to the more inclusive South Australian Literary and Scientific Association. Its aim was "the cultivation and diffusion of useful knowledge throughout the colony by all means which may lie in its power", in particular literature, the arts, history and natural science".

Gouger played a key role in the society. He had been working with Hanson and Wakefield in developing a research library in which they gathered material not just as regards Australia, but also from the experiences of the British colonisation of Canada and North America. Other key people in the foundation of Southern Australia were also involved: Rowland Hill, Edward Furniss and John Brown. It attracted 40 members within its first 16 months of meetings in London, many of whom became prominent colonists. Fortnightly meetings were held in which the conquest of the area could be planned.

The members of the association were radical reformers, holding ideals of social equity and separation of church and state, and were all wealthy, well-educated gentlemen. Their ideals overlapped to some degree with the lower-brow Mechanics' Institute movement, with both originating in the huge increase in industry, printed matter, knowledge and ideas in the early 19th century. They all wanted to use this new knowledge to improve themselves and society, using lectures, classes and libraries.

Although the Association lapsed and meetings ceased, a collection of books donated by members was intended as the basis of the new colony's library, and the colonists brought the collection to the Colony of South Australia aboard the Tam O'Shanter, which arrived on 18 December 1836.

It played a part in the foundation of the South Australian Museum, the State Library of South Australia (via a merger with the Adelaide Mechanics' Institute, creating the Mechanics' Institute and South Australian Library), and the Royal Society of South Australia.

== See also ==
- Mechanics' institutes of Australia
- South Australian Literary Societies' Union
