= Glass mullion system =

Glazing system using clamps and plates

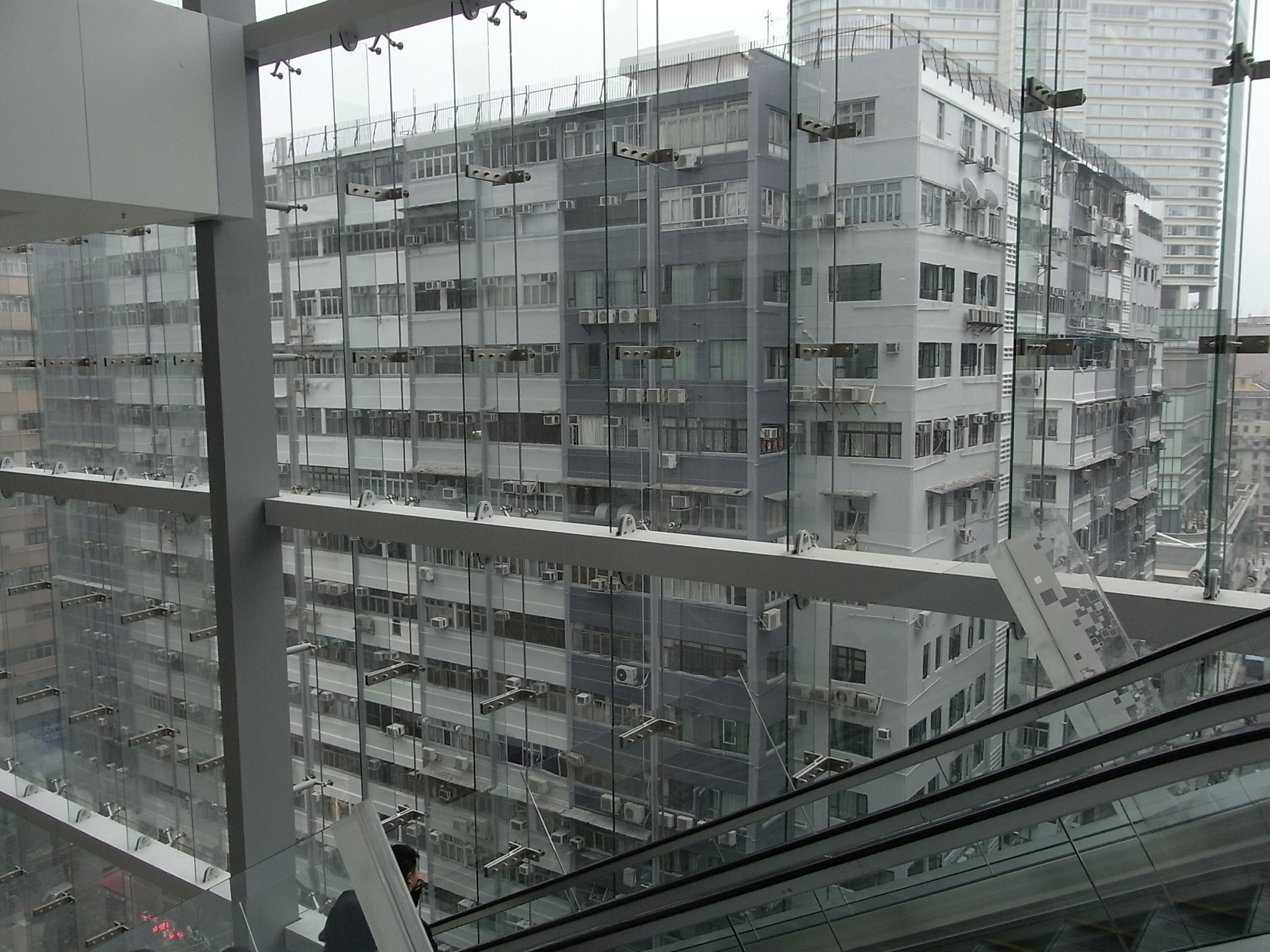
Glass mullion system with vertical glass fins

Glass mullion system or glass fin system is a glazing system in which sheets of tempered glass are suspended from special clamps, stabilized by perpendicular stiffeners of tempered glass, and joined by a structural silicone sealant or by metal patch plates.

== Notable examples ==
I. M. Pei's National Airlines Sundrome at Terminal 6 of JFK Airport was noted for pioneering the use of glass mullions. The airline terminal has since been closed and demolished, after it and the adjacent TWA Flight Center were replaced by a new Terminal 5.

Other buildings employing this system include the Rose Center for Earth and Space, Harvard Medical School in Boston, Massachusetts, NASDAQ Marketsite in New York and the Brooklyn Museum of Art.
