= Arthur Korn (architect) =

German architect (1891–1978)

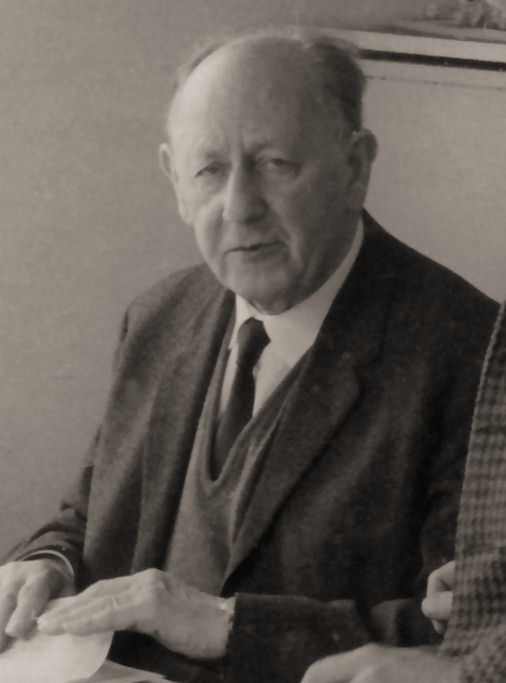
- Korn at the Hammersmith College of Art and Building in London
- Born: 4 June 1891; Breslau, German Empire
- Died: 14 November 1978 (aged 87); Vienna, Austria
- Occupation: Architect

Arthur Korn (4 June 1891 – 14 November 1978) was a German architect and urban planner who was a proponent of modernism in Germany and the United Kingdom.

== Life and career ==
Korn was born in Breslau, Silesia, German Empire (now Wrocław, Poland) on 4 June 1891. Between 1909 and 1911, he studied at the Königliche Kunst- und Kunstgewerbeschule (Royal Art and Crafts School) in Berlin. After World War I he worked briefly at the office of expressionist architect Erich Mendelsohn. In the 1920s he was active in the modernist architectural movement in Berlin, and associated with Bauhaus architects such as Walter Gropius and Ernst May. He was a member of Der Ring Berlin architectural collective. He published his influential work Glas. Im Bau und als Gebrauchsgegenstand (published in English as Glass in Modern Architecture) in 1929. After the Nazi rise to power he was forbidden to practice as an architect in Germany on account of being Jewish. He moved first to Yugoslavia, then, in 1938, to London. There he joined the Modern Architectural Research (MARS) Group where, as chair of the town planning subcommittee, he was involved in drawing up the modernist MARS plan for post war London published in 1942. Between 1941 and 1945, he taught architecture and planning at the Oxford School of Architecture, then in London from 1945, not only at the Architectural Association, where his teaching contribution became widely known, but also at the Hammersmith College of Art and Building, for whose School of Architecture he is credited as being one of the major influences in its re-emergence after the Second World War. He was for many years a resident in the Isokon flats in Lawn Road, London, and retired in 1965 before moving to Austria in 1969.

== Glass in Modern Architecture ==
-Influenced by the principles of the Die Neue Sachlichkeit (New Objectivity), Glass in Modern Architecture, published in 1929, has been described by Raymond McGrath as a 'prophetic book'. As well as visually presenting possibilities of glass, for instance, in the exterior walls of buildings, for the first time, it presents a pictorial history of the new architecture of the 1920s, including the early work of Mies van der Rohe, the Bauhaus at Dessau and the Weissenhofsiedlung in Stuttgart. The written part of the book is limited, consisting of an introduction and some writing on material and techniques, omitted from later editions. Something of Korn's enthusiasm for the new architectural possibilities of the material is conveyed. Glass, he claims ist da, und es ist nicht da, is 'noticeable yet not quite visible ...the great membrane, full of mystery, delicate yet tough'.

== The MARS Plan for London ==
"The plan for London issued by the Mars Group (the English wing of CIAM) and prepared by their Town Planning Committee was a marked contrast to anything that had gone before and, one might add, anything produced subsequently. It was frankly Utopian and Socialistic in concept." Dennis Sharp, 1971.

Influenced by the pan European CIAM (Congrès Internationaux d'Architecture Moderne), the MARS (Modern Architectural Research) Group were interested in applying the ideas of the modernist movement in Britain, most notably in a post war plan for London. As chair of the plan's governing committee at MARS, Arthur Korn worked with what was described as a 'small and devoted' group including architects Arthur Ling and Maxwell Fry, the latter who worked as secretary, and fellow Jewish emigre, engineer Felix Samuely. Korn is described as having been 'the main spring of the enterprise' and as providing an 'infectious enthusiasm' that drove the project forward. Influenced by the Soviet urbanist Milyutin, the plan essentially conceived the centre of the city remaining much the same but with a series of linear forms or tongues extending from the Thames, described as like a herring bone, composed of social units and based around the rail network. Habitation in each social unit was to consist mainly of flats and owed much to Le Corbusier's notion of the Unite d'Habitation. Described as 'unworkable' by Dennis Sharp, in his 1971 essay on the plan, he concedes it 'was not a concrete scheme but a concept that would by its very nature produce interpretations'. Marmaras and Sutcliffe argue the plan 'saw London almost entirely in terms of movement ...[being] presented primarily as a centre of exchange and communications'. Moughtin and Shirley (1995) note that one of the aims of the plan was to promote public transport, where with railways integral to planning, the 'need for cars will be few'. Korn's initial chairmanship of the plan was interrupted by his 18-month internment in the Isle of Man from 1939, on account of his German citizenship and perceived Communist sympathies, the period during which work on the plan fissled out. On his release, in 1941, work recommenced, an exhibition of the plan was organised and a 'description and analysis' was published under the joint authorship of Arthur Korn and Felix Samuely in the Architectural Association journal in 1942.

== Teaching years at the Architectural Association ==
Arthur Korn taught at the Architectural Association in London, from 1945, for over 20 years. A year after his retirement, a collection of essays was published, edited by Dennis Sharp, to mark his time spent there. Sharp's preface referred to Korn's 'quiet achievement in influencing generations of architects and planners', through his work and his teaching. Edward Carter's introduction writes of Korn as teacher, who, at this best, gave the impression of 'a great performance', and describes how:

"The widening of his exposition from some explicit detail to a comprehensive view of life as a whole, illustrated with athletic gesture and by drawings which extended exuberantly across the blackboard to comprehend in one diagram a whole wealth of ideas, and all the time the flow of his emotive, witty multilingual words…".

Influenced by the unitary aesthetic of the Bauhaus, Arthur Korn was described as someone whose vision of architecture spanned the 'whole range of scales from town to teaspoon'. In his teaching, as in his work in England, he was concerned with the relationship between architecture and planning, how, through these forms, we can express the 'uniqueness of modern life' and overcome the problems it presents.

Whilst contributing to a retrospective analysis of the MARS plan for London, in 1971, Korn describes architecture as something in which:

"The battle between the machine-man and the analytical artist, between the collective and the individual, putting itself in order like the voice of music – free and according to mystic laws – repeats the ascension from the necessity of the constructive-analytical to the intuitive-artistic reality.".

Whilst praised for his passion and willingness to accept 'paper plans' and 'Utopian projects', he could sometimes be uncompromising and frank. On a visit to a newly built block of flats in Portsmouth, he is known to have exclaimed to those present, many of whom were ex-students of his: 'You have built these chicken-coops, these rabbit hutches! You?'.

== Buildings ==
- 1922–1924: Large house for Jeanette Goldstein, later "House of German gymnasia", West Berlin, Arysallee / Sensburger Avenue, demolished (damaged in World War II, demolished 1957).
- 1923: Kruger residence in Berlin-Westend.
- 1924: Benda residence in Berlin-Westend.
- 1924: Factory Building the Hermann Guiard & Co. shoe factory in Burg bei Magdeburg, Blumenthaler highway.
- 1924: Residence for Dr. Krojanker in Burg, near Magdeburg.
- 1924: Goldstein House, Berlin-Westend, (with Siegfried Weitzmann).
- 1924: House for Fritz Wasservogel in Berlin-Westend, Länderallee / Bayernallee (Demolished in 1970).
- 1925: Optician Shop of the company Fromm & Co. in Berlin, Memhardstraße 4 (destroyed in World War II)
- 1926: Reconstruction of the office building of the Berlin guard and Schließgesellschaft in Berlin.
- 1927–1928: House of Dr. Martin Abraham, in Berlin-Zehlendorf, Berry Street.
- 1928: Shop of the company Kopp & Joseph in Berlin.
- 1930–1931: new buildings of the rubber factory Fromms Act by Julius Fromm in Berlin-Köpenick, Friedrichshagener Street.

== Books ==
- Glas. Im Bau und als Gebrauchsgegenstand. (Glass in Modern Architecture) (Berlin: 1929)
- History Builds the Town. (London: Lund, Humphries, 1953)

== Literature ==
- Andreas Zeese: Die vergessene Moderne. Arthur Korn – Architekt, Urbanist, Lehrer (1891–1978). Leben und Werk eines jüdischen Avantgardisten in Berlin und London. Diss. Universität Wien 2010 (in German)
- The History of European Photography 1900–1938, FOTOFO., 2011. ISBN 978-80-85739-55-8
