= Tam O'Shanter (ship) =

19th century sailing ship

History

United Kingdom
- Route: Southern Australia
- Builder: Robert Reay, North Hylton, Sunderland
- Launched: 2 April 1829
- Fate: Grounded 30 August 1837

General characteristics
- Class & type: Barque
- Tons burthen: 383, or 38331/94 (bm)
- Length: 104 ft 8 in (31.9 m)
- Beam: 28 ft 8 in (8.7 m)
- Height: 5 ft 9 in (1.8 m)

Tam O'Shanter was a sailing ship built in 1829, in North Hylton. In 1830, she sailed to India under a license from the British East India Company (EIC). Next, she was a West Indiaman, sailing to Bermuda and Jamaica. She then played a role in the founding of Adelaide in 1836. Tam O'Shanter ran aground in 1837, off Tasmania and was considered a write-off.

== Career ==
The original owner was Captain Lindsey. She first appeared in Lloyd's Register in 1830.

In 1813, the EIC had lost its monopoly on the trade between India and Britain. British ships were then free to sail to India or the Indian Ocean under a license from the EIC. Captain T.Lindsay sailed for Madras and Bengal on 4 July 1830.

Year	Master	Owner	Trade	Source
1830	Lindsey	Lindsey & Co.	London-Calcutta	LR
1835	Davis	Baker & Co.	London–Jamaica	LR; small repairs 1835

In 1835, Thomas Dobson bought her, and the merchant Osmond Gilles chartered her as part of the First Fleet of South Australia. In 1836, Tam O'Shanter, Whiteman Freeman, master, accompanied HMS Buffalo on the trip, with Gilles travelling on Buffalo. They left London on 29 July, arriving at Kingscote on 20 November. They then entered Holdfast Bay, but ran aground when they tried to enter Port River.

Tam O'Shanter ran aground on 19 December 1836, was refloated on 23 December, and was beached.

Tam O'Shanter was carrying a consignment of books from the South Australian Literary and Scientific Association, which had been formed in London in 1834. This included 117 books provided by Robert Gouger, who had arrived shortly before on board Africaine. A mishap occurred whilst unloading, and the trunk containing the 200 books fell in the sea. However they were recovered undamaged. These books constituted the kernel of what was to become the State Library of South Australia.

== Fate ==
Tam O'Shanter was wrecked on 30 August 1837, on the north coast of Van Diemen's Land, 16 nautical miles (30 km) east of the mouth of the Tamar River. She was on a voyage from South Australia to Sydney.

== See also ==
- First Fleet of South Australia
