= C. E. Owen Smyth =

Irish-born South Australian public servant (1851–1925)

C. E. Owen Smyth CMG ISO
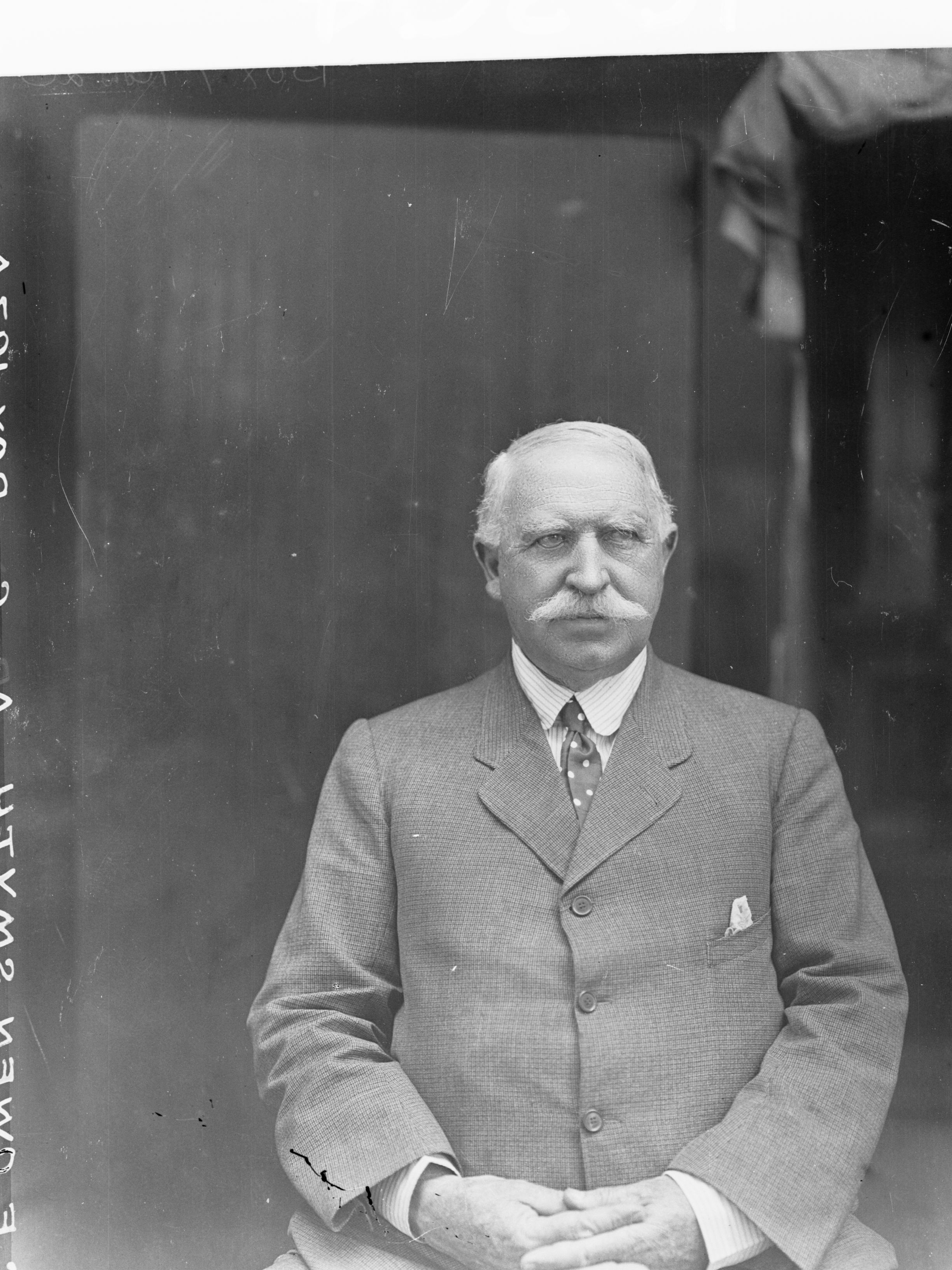
- Smyth, c. 1925
- Born: Charles Edward Owen Smyth; 1 January 1851; Ferrybank, County Kilkenny, Ireland
- Died: 1 October 1925 (aged 74); Hazelwood Park, South Australia, Australia
- Resting place: North Road Cemetery
- Occupation: Public servant
- Title: Superintendent of Public Buildings, South Australia
- Term: 1886–1920
- Spouse: Bessie Davidson (m. 1879; died 1925)
- Children: 3

Charles Edward Owen Smyth (Note: His surname remained Smyth, but was often treated as a double-barrelled name, sometimes even hyphenated as Owen-Smyth.) CMG ISO (1 January 1851 – 1 October 1925), commonly referred to as Owen Smyth, was an Irish-born South Australian public servant.

== Early life ==
Smyth was born at Ferrybank, County Kilkenny (either Ferrybank, Waterford or Ferrybank, Wexford), the son of Stephen Smyth, a naval architect, and his wife (née Owen), who claimed descent direct descent from "Meurig, King of Dyfid" (perhaps Meurig ap Tewdrig). He was educated at Erasmus Smith High School, Dublin, and then travelled the world as a sailor and house painter before settling in Australia in 1873. He spent two years as a builder's foreman and manager in Victoria before moving to Adelaide in May 1876.

== Career ==
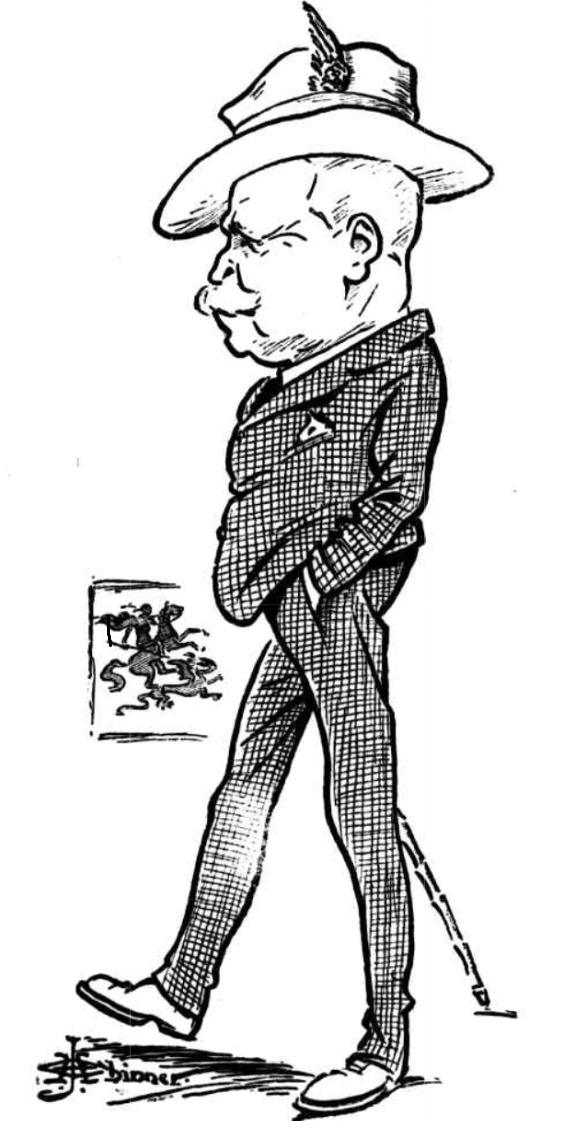
caricature by J. H. Chinner

He gained employment as a clerk in the South Australian Council of Education's architectural office under E. J. Woods. When Woods was appointed architect-in-chief by the Boucaut government, Smyth was promoted to clerk-in-charge of Woods' office, and de facto chief of staff to Woods. His handling of a dispute between the Government and the Kapunda Marble Company over the Parliament House contract brought him to the notice of several government Ministers. Justice Boucaut, when Premier, had also noticed Smyth and had him earmarked for promotion. This was not to happen as soon as expected, as Smyth burst a blood vessel, which necessitated his return to England for a year. In 1886, the Architect-in-Chief's Department was abolished and the Downer government appointed Smyth to the new post of superintendent of public buildings in the Works and Buildings Department, a position which he held until his retirement in January 1920.

Although not an architect, Smyth had considerable influence in the design, construction and maintenance of South Australia’s public buildings. A thorough-going patriot, he insisted on the use of Australian and British materials. Public buildings supervised by Smyth include Withall and Wells' Jubilee Exhibition Building (1887), the north wing extension of the South Australian Museum and the Art Gallery of South Australia, the South Australian School of Mines and Industries (1903), the Thebarton Mounted Police Barracks, Port Road, Thebarton, the Margaret Graham Nurses' Home (1910–1911) on Frome Road, the Magill Home, the Bedford Park Sanatorium, and the Torrens Parade Ground. He also influenced the landscaping and beautification of the Torrens Lake surrounds and the North Terrace makeover, all with an eye to value for money.

Gilles Street Primary School was built in 1899 to his designs, and heritage-listed on the South Australian Heritage Register in 1986.

Following Smyth's retirement, the Works and Buildings Department was renamed the Architect-in-Chief’s Department, a title it held until 1960. In 1921 Smyth sailed to England with the intention of living there but returned to South Australia in 1923, writing a series of reminiscences of the department and its staff, which were published in the newspapers.

== Honours ==
Smyth was appointed Companion of the Imperial Service Order (ISO) in 1903 and Companion of the Order of St Michael and St George (CMG) in the 1920 New Year Honours.

== Other interests ==
Smyth, an ardent imperialist, was active in several imperialist and patriotic organisations, and made sure portraits of the monarch were hung in all notable locations within his buildings. Smyth was a founding member of the South Australian branch of the Royal Society of St George. He was also an active Freemason, belonging to the Duke of Leinster Lodge, No. 363. During World War I, he took a great interest in the welfare of serving soldiers, and gave much of his time, influence and expertise to the Cheer-Up Society.

== Family ==
Smyth married Bessie Saunderson Davidson (c. 1855 – 22 February 1933), daughter of John Davidson, of Galashiels and London, on 19 June 1879. Their children were:

- Margaret Laidlaw "Madge" Owen Smyth (20 July 1882 – c. 25 May 1973), who married barrister Edward Walter Godfrey (c. 1882 – 14 January 1920) of Shanghai, China, on 26 January 1911. She had a son in Shanghai on 23 September 1920.
- Trevor Owen Smyth (4 April 1886 – 11 May 1915), who was killed at Gallipoli while serving as a lieutenant with the 10th Battalion, A.I.F.
- Arthur Gaynor Owen Smyth (2 October 1897 – ?), who joined the Royal Artillery in April 1916, direct from St Peter's College, and saw service on the Somme, and later in Mesopotamia, where he was promoted staff captain.

They had a home at Davenport terrace, Hazelwood Park.

Smyth's brother, Reverend Arthur Owen Smyth (c. 1857 – 23 August 1890), was a curate in Durham, and died at his brother's residence, "Egryn", Kensington Park, South Australia.
