= New Burlington Galleries =

Former art gallery in London

The New Burlington Galleries was an art gallery at 5 Burlington Gardens, Mayfair, London.

From 11 June to 4 July 1936, they held the International Surrealist Exhibition, the first full exhibition of surrealist art in the UK.

From 7 June to 28 August 1938, the gallery showed Twentieth Century German Art, the largest international response to the National Socialist campaign against so-called ‘degenerate art’.

In October 1938, they exhibited Picasso's Guernica together with preparatory paintings and sketches to raise funds for the National Joint Committee for Spanish Relief.
